This is a seat by seat list of candidates in the 2000 Canadian election.

For more information about the election see 2000 Canadian federal election.

Abbreviations guide
Alliance – Canadian Reform Conservative Alliance
BQ – Bloc Québécois
CAP – Canadian Action Party
Comm. – Communist Party of Canada
Green – Green Party of Canada
Ind. – Independent
Liberal – Liberal Party of Canada
Mar. – Marijuana Party
M-L – Marxist-Leninist Party of Canada
NA – Nil
NLP – Natural Law Party
NDP – New Democratic Party
PC – Progressive Conservative Party of Canada

Markup
Names in boldface type represent party leaders and cabinet ministers.
† represents that the incumbent chose not to run again.
§ represents that the incumbent was defeated for nomination.

NOTE: All candidate names are those on the official list of confirmed candidates; names in media or on party websites may differ slightly.

Newfoundland and Labrador

|-
| style="background-color:whitesmoke" |Bonavista—Trinity—Conception
||
|Brian Tobin22,09654.38%
|
|Randy Wayne Dawe1,0512.59%
|
|Fraser March6,47315.93%
|
|Jim Morgan11,00927.10%
|
|
||
|Fred Mifflin†
|-
| style="background-color:whitesmoke" |Burin—St. George's
||
|Bill Matthews14,60347.52%
|
|Peter Fenwick1,5114.92%
|
|David Sullivan9243.01%
|
|Fred Pottle5,79818.87%
|
|Sam Synard (NA)7,89125.68%
||
|Bill Matthews
|-
| style="background-color:whitesmoke" |Gander—Grand Falls
||
|George Baker15,87455.02%
|
|Orville Penney1,9126.63%
|
|Bill Broderick2,8769.97%
|
|Roger K. Pike8,19128.39%
|
|
||
|George Baker
|-
| style="background-color:whitesmoke" |Humber—St. Barbe—Baie Verte
||
|Gerry Byrne15,40548.53%
|
|Murdock Cole1,7025.36%
|
|Trevor Taylor8,29726.14%
|
|Peter McBreairty6,34019.97%
|
|
||
|Gerry Byrne
|-
| style="background-color:whitesmoke" |Labrador
||
|Lawrence O'Brien7,15368.99%
|
|Eugene Burt6776.53%
|
|Amanda Will1,28412.38%
|
|Hayward Broomfield1,25412.09%
|
|
||
|Lawrence O'Brien
|-
|rowspan=2 style="background-color:whitesmoke" |St. John's East
|rowspan=2 |
|rowspan=2 |Peter Miller13,83531.19%
|rowspan=2 |
|rowspan=2 |Garry Hartle1,1442.58%
|rowspan=2 |
|rowspan=2 |Carol Cantwell5,39512.16%
|rowspan=2 |
|rowspan=2 | Norman E. Doyle23,60653.22%
|
|Judy Day (Ind.)254 0.57%
|rowspan=2 |
|rowspan=2 |Norman Doyle
|-
|
|Michael Rayment (NLP)122 0.28%
|-
| style="background-color:whitesmoke" |St. John's West
|
|Chuck Furey14,13733.01%
|
|Eldon Drost8401.96%
|
|Dave Curtis4,74411.08%
||
|Loyola Hearn22,95953.62%
|
|Michael Rendell (NLP)1410.33%
||
|Loyola Hearn

Prince Edward Island

|-
| style="background-color:whitesmoke" |Cardigan
||
|Lawrence MacAulay8,54548.06%
|
|Darrell Hickox5002.81%
|
|Deborah Kelly Hawkes4652.62%
|
|Kevin MacAdam8,26946.51%
|
|
||
|Lawrence MacAulay
|-
| style="background-color:whitesmoke" |Egmont
||
|Joe McGuire9,22750.05%
|
|Jeff Sullivan9525.16%
|
|Nancy Wallace1,1396.18%
|
|John Griffin7,11638.60%
|
|
||
|Joe McGuire
|-
|rowspan=2 style="background-color:whitesmoke" |Hillsborough
|rowspan=2 |
|rowspan=2 |Shawn Murphy8,27741.81%
|rowspan=2 |
|rowspan=2 |Gerry Stewart1,0055.08%
|rowspan=2 |
|rowspan=2 |Dody Crane4,32821.86%
|rowspan=2 |
|rowspan=2 |Darren W. Peters6,03930.50%
|
|Peter Cameron (NLP)92 0.46%
|rowspan=2 |
|rowspan=2 |George Proud†
|-
|
|Baird Judson (NA)58 0.29%
|-
| style="background-color:whitesmoke" |Malpeque
||
|Wayne Easter8,97248.62%
|
|Chris Wall1,2626.84%
|
|Ken Bingham7824.24%
|
|Jim Gorman7,18638.94%
|
|Jeremy Stiles (Green)2501.35%
||
|Wayne Easter
|}

Nova Scotia

|-
| style="background-color:whitesmoke" |Bras d'Or—Cape Breton
||
|Rodger Cuzner20,81554.85%
|
|John M. Currie1,4833.91%
|
|Michelle Dockrill7,53719.86%
|
|Alfie MacLeod8,11421.38%
|
|
||
|Michelle Dockrill
|-
| style="background-color:whitesmoke" |Cumberland—Colchester
|
|Dianne Brushett10,27126.61%
|
|Bryden Ryan4,98112.91%
|
|James Arthur Harpell4,62911.99%
||
|Bill Casey18,71648.49%
|
|
||
|Bill Casey
|-
| style="background-color:whitesmoke" |Dartmouth
|
|Bernie Boudreau12,40833.14%
|
|Jordi Morgan3,2828.76%
||
|Wendy Lill13,58536.28%
|
|Tom McInnis8,08521.59%
|
|Charles Spurr (M-L)860.23%
||
|Wendy Lill
|-
|rowspan=3 style="background-color:whitesmoke" |Halifax
|rowspan=3 |
|rowspan=3 |Kevin Little13,53932.99%
|rowspan=3 |
|rowspan=3 |Amery Boyer2,3485.72%
|rowspan=3 |
|rowspan=3 |Alexa McDonough16,56340.36%
|rowspan=3 |
|rowspan=3 |Paul Fitzgibbons7,25517.68%
|
|Kevin Dumont Corkill (M-L)113 0.28%
|rowspan=3 |
|rowspan=3 |Alexa McDonough
|-
|
|Michael G. Oddy (Green)590 1.44%
|-
|
|Mike Patriquen (Mar.)627 1.53%
|-
| style="background-color:whitesmoke" |Halifax West
||
|Geoff Regan18,32739.21%
|
|Hilda Stevens4,5319.70%
|
|Gordon Earle14,01629.99%
|
|Charles Cirtwill9,70120.76%
|
|Tony Seed (M-L)1600.34%
||
|Gordon Earle
|-
|rowspan=4 style="background-color:whitesmoke" |Kings—Hants
|rowspan=4 |
|rowspan=4 |Claude O'Hara13,21330.23%
|rowspan=4 |
|rowspan=4 |Gerry Fulton4,61810.56%
|rowspan=4 |
|rowspan=4 |Kaye Johnson7,24416.57%
|rowspan=4 |
|rowspan=4 |Scott Brison17,61240.29%
|
|Richard Hennigar (NLP)133 0.30%
|rowspan=4 |
|rowspan=4 |Joe Clark‡
|-
|
|Jim King (Mar.)669 1.53%
|-
|
|Graham Jake MacDonald (Comm.)85 0.19%
|-
|
|Kenneth MacEachern (Ind.)140 0.32%
|-
| style="background-color:whitesmoke" |Pictou—Antigonish—Guysborough
|
|Raymond Mason12,58531.57%
|
|Harvey Henderson2,9307.35%
|
|Wendy Panagopoulos4,49811.28%
||
|Peter G. MacKay19,29848.41%
|
|Darryl Gallivan (Ind.)5521.38%
||
|Peter MacKay
|-
| style="background-color:whitesmoke" |Sackville—Musquodoboit Valley—Eastern Shore
|
|Bruce Stephen12,86432.56%
|
|Bill Stevens4,77312.08%
||
|Peter Stoffer13,61934.48%
|
|Wade Marshall7,58919.21%
|
|Melanie Patriquen (Mar.)6581.67%
||
|Peter Stoffer
|-
| style="background-color:whitesmoke" |South Shore
|
|Derek Wells12,67735.12%
|
|Evan Walters4,69713.01%
|
|Bill Zimmerman4,39412.17%
||
|Gerald Keddy14,32839.69%
|
|
||
|Gerald Keddy
|-
| style="background-color:whitesmoke" |Sydney—Victoria
||
|Mark Eyking19,38849.83%
|
|Rod A. M. Farrell1,5283.93%
|
|Peter Mancini14,21636.53%
|
|Anna Curtis-Steele3,7799.71%
|
|
||
|Peter Mancini
|-
| style="background-color:whitesmoke" |West Nova
||
|Robert Thibault12,78336.09%
|
|Mike Donaldson6,58118.58%
|
|Phil Roberts3,97611.23%
|
|Mark Muise12,08034.11%
|
|
||
|Mark Muise
|}

New Brunswick

|-
| style="background-color:whitesmoke" |Acadie—Bathurst
|
|Bernard Thériault20,36240.27%
|
|Jean Gauvin2,3144.58%
||
|Yvon Godin23,56846.61%
|
|Alcide Leger4,3218.55%
|
|
||
|Yvon Godin
|-
| style="background-color:whitesmoke" |Beausejour—Petitcodiac
||
|Dominic LeBlanc21,46547.10%
|
|Tom Taylor6,25613.73%
|
|Inka Milewski3,2177.06%
|
|Angela Vautour18,71632.11%
|
|
||
|Angela Vautour
|-
| style="background-color:whitesmoke" |Fredericton
||
|Andy Scott14,17538.60%
|
|Allan D. Neill8,81424.00%
|
|Michael Dunn2,5847.04%
|
|Raj Venugopal10,91929.73%
|
|William H. Parker (NLP)2330.63%
||
|Andy Scott
|-
| style="background-color:whitesmoke" |Fundy—Royal
|
|John King11,42230.28%
|
|Rob Moore8,39222.25%
|
|John Calder2,6286.97%
||
|John Herron15,27940.51%
|
|
||
|John Herron
|-
| style="background-color:whitesmoke" |Madawaska—Restigouche
||
|Jeannot Castonguay19,91352.27%
|
|Scott Chedore1,9585.14%
|
|Claude J. Albert1,8114.75%
|
|Jean F. Dubé14,41737.84%
|
|
||
|Jean F. Dubé
|-
| style="background-color:whitesmoke" |Miramichi
||
|Charles Hubbard17,04751.44%
|
|Ken Clark5,29815.99%
|
|Allan Goodfellow2,4537.40%
|
|David Kelly8,34125.17%
|
|
||
|Charles Hubbard
|-
| style="background-color:whitesmoke" |Moncton—Riverview—Dieppe
||
|Claudette Bradshaw26,54558.74%
|
|Kathryn M. Barnes8,13017.99%
|
|Hélène Lapointe3,1396.95%
|
|Serge Landry7,08215.67%
|
|Laurent Maltais (NLP)2970.66%
||
|Claudette Bradshaw
|-
| style="background-color:whitesmoke" |New Brunswick Southwest
|
|Winston Gamblin8,44227.53%
|
|John Erbs6,56221.40%
|
|Habib Kilisli1,1733.83%
||
|Greg Thompson14,48947.25%
|
|
||
|Greg Thompson
|-
|rowspan=3 style="background-color:whitesmoke" |Saint John
|rowspan=3 |
|rowspan=3 |Paul Zed9,53528.98%
|rowspan=3 |
|rowspan=3 |Peter Touchbourne2,9809.06%
|rowspan=3 |
|rowspan=3 |Rod Hill2,9899.09%
|rowspan=3 |
|rowspan=3 |Elsie Wayne16,75150.92%
|
|Miville Couture (NLP)52 0.16%
|rowspan=3 |
|rowspan=3 |Elsie Wayne
|-
|
|Vern M. Garnett (Green)131 0.40%
|-
|
|Jim Wood (Mar.)461 1.40%
|-
| style="background-color:whitesmoke" |Tobique—Mactaquac
||
|Andy Savoy10,89733.60%
|
|Adam Richardson9,57329.51%
|
|Carolyn Van Dine1,2163.75%
|
|Gilles Bernier10,75033.14%
|
|
||
|Gilles Bernier
|}

Quebec

Eastern Quebec

|-
| style="background-color:whitesmoke" |Bellechasse—Etchemins—Montmagny—L'Islet
|
|François Langlois14,97337.44%
||
|Gilbert Normand19,16347.91%
|
|Jean-Claude Roy4,22410.56%
|
|
|
|Suzanne Lafond1,6364.09%
|
|
||
|Gilbert Normand
|-
| style="background-color:whitesmoke" |Bonaventure—Gaspé—Îles-de-la-Madeleine—Pabok
|
|Raynald Blais15,53243.00%
||
|Georges Farrah19,21353.19%
|
|Linda Fournier7642.12%
|
|Fred Kraenzel6131.70%
|
|
|
|
||
|Yvan Bernier
|-
| style="background-color:whitesmoke" |Kamouraska—Rivière-du-Loup—Témiscouata—Les Basques
||
|Paul Crête23,31959.99%
|
|Helen Ouellet11,79430.34%
|
|René Théberge1,3733.53%
|
|Elaine Côté8362.15%
|
|André Pacquet1,3823.56%
|
|Normand Fournier (M-L)1700.44%
||
|Paul Crête
|-
| style="background-color:whitesmoke" |Lévis-et-Chutes-de-la-Chaudière
||
|Antoine Dubé26,39841.85%
|
|Shirley Baril21,52234.12%
|
|Jacques Bergeron9,15214.51%
|
|France Michaud1,4112.24%
|
|Réal St-Laurent4,2226.69%
|
|André Cloutier (Comm.)3740.59%
||
|Antoine DubéLévis
|-
| style="background-color:whitesmoke" |Matapédia—Matane
||
|Jean-Yves Roy14,67846.64%
|
|Marc Bélanger14,40245.76%
|
|
|
|Karine Paquet-Gauthier9352.97%
|
|Germain Dumas1,4564.63%
|
|
||
|René Canuel
|-
| style="background-color:whitesmoke" |Rimouski—Neigette-et-La-Mitis
||
|Suzanne Tremblay19,75959.55%
|
|Réal Marmen9,79529.52%
|
|Gerard Gosselin1,2803.86%
|
|René Lemieux5251.58%
|
|Réal Blais1,1503.47%
|
|Lyse Beauchemin (NLP)6732.03%
||
|Suzanne TremblayRimouski—Mitis
|-
|}

Côte-Nord and Saguenay

|-
|rowspan=2 style="background-color:whitesmoke" |Beauport—Montmorency—Côte-de-Beaupré—Île-d'Orléans
|rowspan=2 |
|rowspan=2 |Michel Guimond21,34141.55%
|rowspan=2 |
|rowspan=2 |Chantal Plante18,71436.43%
|rowspan=2 |
|rowspan=2 |Robert Giroux5,87811.44%
|rowspan=2 |
|rowspan=2 |Eric Hébert8691.69%
|rowspan=2 |
|rowspan=2 |Lise Bernier2,9165.68%
|
|Jean Bédard (M-L)283 0.55%
|rowspan=2 |
|rowspan=2 |Michel GuimondBeauport—Montmorency—Orléans
|-
|
|Mathieu Giroux (Mar.)1,364 2.66%
|-
| style="background-color:whitesmoke" |Charlevoix
||
|Gérard Asselin20,47961.44%
|
|Marjolaine Gagnon9,30827.93%
|
|Pierre Paradis1,9055.72%
|
|Joss Duhaime4841.45%
|
|Doris Grondin1,1543.46%
|
|
||
|Gérard Asselin
|-
| style="background-color:whitesmoke" |Chicoutimi—Le Fjord
|
|Noel Tremblay15,07336.17%
||
|André Harvey20,10548.24%
|
|Douglas Schroeder-Tabah2,0014.80%
|
|Alain Ranger6981.67%
|
|
|
|Mauril Desbiens (Ind.)3,7979.11%
||
|André HarveyChicoutimi
|-
| style="background-color:whitesmoke" |Jonquière
||
|Jocelyne Girard-Bujold16,18950.07%
|
|Jean-Guy Boily11,57435.80%
|
|Sylvaine Néron3,42810.60%
|
|Michel Deraiche1,1393.52%
|
|
|
|
||
|Jocelyne Girard-Bujold
|-
| style="background-color:whitesmoke" |Lac-Saint-Jean—Saguenay
||
|Stéphan Tremblay21,39166.17%
|
|Jérôme Tremblay7,53623.31%
|
|Yannick Caron1,5364.75%
|
|Linda Proulx4171.29%
|
|Claude Gagnon5351.65%
|
|Gilles Lavoie (Ind.)9122.82%
||
|Stéphan TremblayLac-Saint-Jean
|-
| style="background-color:whitesmoke" |Manicouagan
||
|Ghislain Fournier11,59553.24%
|
|Robert Labadie7,77035.68%
|
|Laurette de Champlain1,1975.50%
|
|Normand Caplette3861.77%
|
|Gaby-Gabriel Robert8303.81%
|
|
||
|Ghislain Fournier
|-
| style="background-color:whitesmoke" |Roberval
||
|Michel Gauthier16,92855.06%
|
|Jean-Pierre Boivin10,68034.74%
|
|Raymond A. Brideau1,8305.95%
|
|Alain Giguère4371.42%
|
|Marie-Christine Huot8702.83%
|
|
||
|Michel Gauthier
|-
|}

Quebec City

|-
| style="background-color:whitesmoke" |Charlesbourg—Jacques-Cartier
||
|Richard Marceau21,86738.29%
|
|Isabelle Thiverge21,04536.85%
|
|Gérard Latulippe8,80115.41%
|
|Françoise Dicaire1,0001.75%
|
|Dann Murray3,2565.70%
|
|
|
|Samuel Moisan-Domm (Green)1,1361.99%
||
|Richard MarceauCharlesbourg
|-
| style="background-color:whitesmoke" |Louis-Hébert
|
|Hélène Alarie21,24036.88%
||
|Hélène Scherrer23,69541.14%
|
|Léonce-E. Roy5,88710.22%
|
|Karl Adomeit1,2002.08%
|
|Clermont Gauthier5,1899.01%
|
|Gisèle Desrochers3820.66%
|
|
||
|Hélène Alarie
|-
|rowspan=2 style="background-color:whitesmoke" |Quebec
|rowspan=2 |
|rowspan=2 |Christiane Gagnon22,79343.43%
|rowspan=2 |
|rowspan=2 |Claudette Tessier-Couture18,61935.48%
|rowspan=2 |
|rowspan=2 |Michel Rivard3,9807.58%
|rowspan=2 |
|rowspan=2 |Jean-Marie Fiset1,7143.25%
|rowspan=2 |
|rowspan=2 |Marc Jalbert3,1716.04%
|rowspan=2 |
|rowspan=2 |Claude Moreau2550.49%
|
|Pierre-E. Paradis (Mar.)1,480 2.82%
|rowspan=2 |
|rowspan=2 |Christiane Gagnon
|-
|
|Gilles Rochette (NLP)482 0.92%
|-
| style="background-color:whitesmoke" |Quebec East
|
|Jean-Paul Marchand21,16637.47%
||
|Jean Guy Carignan21,81338.61%
|
|Robert Martel8,59415.21%
|
|Majella Desmeules1,1922.11%
|
|Richard Joncas3,7276.60%
|
|
|
|
||
|Jean-Paul Marchand
|}

Central Quebec

|-
| style="background-color:whitesmoke" |Bas-Richelieu—Nicolet—Bécancour
||
|Louis Plamondon25,26656.92%
|
|Roland Paradis13,78131.04%
|
|Frédéric Lajoie2,0784.68%
|
|Raymond Dorion4210.95%
|
|Gabriel Rousseau1,9444.38%
|
|Black D. Blackburn (Mar.)9012.03%
||
|Louis PlamondonRichelieu
|-
| style="background-color:whitesmoke" |Berthier—Montcalm
||
|Michel Bellehumeur31,64757.06%
|
|Jean-Carle Hudon16,66930.05%
|
|Réal Naud2,8515.14%
|
|Jean-Pierre De Billy8231.48%
|
|Paul Lavigne2,0113.63%
|
|Sébastien Hénault (Mar.)1,4642.64%
||
|Michel Bellehumeur
|-
| style="background-color:whitesmoke" |Champlain
||
|Marcel Gagnon20,42345.26%
|
|Julie Boulet20,40845.23%
|
|Eric Labranche2,5995.76%
|
|Philippe Toone6721.49%
|
|
|
|Paul Giroux (Mar.)1,0202.26%
||
|Réjean Lefebvre†
|-
| style="background-color:whitesmoke" |Joliette
||
|Pierre Paquette23,61552.20%
|
|Robert Malo14,82032.76%
|
|Clément Lévesque2,4325.38%
|
|François Rivest1,0852.40%
|
|Eric Champagne2,7306.03%
|
|Bob Aubin (Comm.)5601.24%
||
|René Laurin†
|-
| style="background-color:whitesmoke" |Lotbinière—L'Érable
||
|Odina Desrochers15,35145.64%
|
|Luc Dastous12,56337.35%
|
|Pierre Allard2,8278.40%
|
|Dominique Vaillancourt5381.60%
|
|Jean Landry2,3577.01%
|
|
||
|Odina DesrochersLotbinière
|-
| style="background-color:whitesmoke" |Portneuf
|
|Patrice Dallaire15,44435.23%
||
|Claude Duplain17,87740.78%
|
|Howard Bruce6,69915.28%
|
|
|
|François Dion3,8198.71%
|
|
||
|Pierre de Savoye†
|-
| style="background-color:whitesmoke" |Repentigny
||
|Benoît Sauvageau33,62757.80%
|
|David Veillette15,63526.88%
|
|Michel Paulette2,9645.09%
|
|Pierre Péclet8311.43%
|
|Michel Carignan3,1225.37%
|
|Lise Dufour (Mar.)1,9973.43%
||
|Benoît Sauvageau
|-
| style="background-color:whitesmoke" |Saint-Maurice
|
|François Marchand16,82138.96%
||
|Jean Chrétien23,34554.07%
|
|Jean-Guy Mercier1,4613.38%
|
|Raymond Chase3590.83%
|
|Pierre Blais9662.24%
|
|Sylvain Archambault (Comm.)2230.52%
||
|Jean Chrétien
|-
|rowspan=2 style="background-color:whitesmoke" |Trois-Rivières
|rowspan=2 |
|rowspan=2 |Yves Rocheleau22,40546.67%
|rowspan=2 |
|rowspan=2 |Denis Normandin20,60642.92%
|rowspan=2 |
|rowspan=2 |Luc Legaré2,1614.50%
|rowspan=2 |
|rowspan=2 |David Horlock5121.07%
|rowspan=2 |
|rowspan=2 |Scott Healy1,5993.33%
|
|Alexandre Deschênes (M-L)184 0.38%
|rowspan=2 |
|rowspan=2 |Yves Rocheleau
|-
|
|Gilles Raymond (NLP)538 1.12%
|}

Eastern Townships

|-
| style="background-color:whitesmoke" |Beauce
|
|Gary Morin12,32326.51%
||
|Claude Drouin26,03356.01%
|
|Alain Guay5,45211.73%
|
|Pierre Malano4360.94%
|
|Gérard Parent1,6283.50%
|
|Louis Girard (NLP)6111.31%
||
|Claude Drouin
|-
| style="background-color:whitesmoke" |Brome—Missisquoi
|
|André Leroux13,36331.17%
||
|Denis Paradis21,54550.26%
|
|Jacques Loyer1,9774.61%
|
|Jeff Itcush4801.12%
|
|Heward Grafftey5,50212.84%
|
|
||
|Denis Paradis
|-
| style="background-color:whitesmoke" |Compton—Stanstead
|
|Gaston Leroux14,80838.89%
||
|David Price17,72946.56%
|
|Marc Carrier2,0615.41%
|
|Christine Moore5801.52%
|
|Mary Ann Dewey-Plante2,4226.36%
|
|Marc Roy (NLP)4761.25%
||
|David Price
|-
| style="background-color:whitesmoke" |Drummond
||
|Pauline Picard18,97045.27%
|
|André Béliveau14,33534.21%
|
|Jacques Laurin1,6213.87%
|
|Julie Philion4231.01%
|
|Lyne Boisvert6,55915.65%
|
|
||
|Pauline Picard
|-
| style="background-color:whitesmoke" |Frontenac—Mégantic
|
|Jean-Guy Chrétien15,70342.27%
||
|Gérard Binet17,06945.95%
|
|Stéphane Musial1,7514.71%
|
|Olivier Chalifoux4271.15%
|
|Nicole Massicotte1,4974.03%
|
|Pierre Luc Fournier (Mar.)6981.88%
||
|Jean-Guy Chrétien
|-
| style="background-color:whitesmoke" |Richmond—Arthabaska
|
|André Bellavance18,06736.47%
|
|Aldéi Beaudoin10,41621.03%
|
|Philippe Ardilliez1,9303.90%
|
|Vincent Bernier3190.64%
||
|André Bachand18,43037.20%
|
|Christian Simard (NLP)3750.76%
||
|André Bachand
|-
| style="background-color:whitesmoke" |Saint-Hyacinthe—Bagot
||
|Yvan Loubier25,91655.41%
|
|Michel Gaudette16,26534.77%
|
|Jacques Bousquet2,1614.62%
|
|Rachel Dicaire4991.07%
|
|Frédéric Mantha1,9324.13%
|
|
||
|Yvan Loubier
|-
| style="background-color:whitesmoke" |Shefford
|
|Michel Benoit19,81643.95%
||
|Diane St-Jacques20,70745.93%
|
|Jean-Jacques Treyvaud1,8674.14%
|
|Elizabeth Morey3800.84%
|
|Audrey Castonguay1,4983.32%
|
|Nicholas Cousineau (Mar.)8191.82%
||
|Diane St-Jacques
|-
|rowspan=3 style="background-color:whitesmoke" |Sherbrooke
|rowspan=3 |
|rowspan=3 |Serge Cardin23,55946.53%
|rowspan=3 |
|rowspan=3 |Jean-François Rouleau21,18241.84%
|rowspan=3 |
|rowspan=3 |Mark Quinlan2,2844.51%
|rowspan=3 |
|rowspan=3 |Craig Wright6771.34%
|rowspan=3 |
|rowspan=3 |Eric L'Heureux1,9553.86%
|
|Joseph Adrien Serge Bourassa-Lacombe (Ind.)294 0.58%
|rowspan=3 |
|rowspan=3 |Serge Cardin
|-
|
|Daniel Jolicoeur (NLP)495 0.98%
|-
|
|Serge Lachapelle (M-L)186 0.37%
|-
|}

Montérégie

|-
| style="background-color:whitesmoke" |Beauharnois—Salaberry
|
|Daniel Turp20,93842.39%
||
|Serge Marcil23,83448.26%
|
|Stephane Renaud1,7823.61%
|
|Elizabeth Clark7031.42%
|
|Roma Myre2,1334.32%
|
|
||
|Daniel Turp
|-
|rowspan=2 style="background-color:whitesmoke" |Brossard—La Prairie
|rowspan=2 |
|rowspan=2 |Nicolas Tétrault16,75832.94%
|rowspan=2 |
|rowspan=2 |Jacques Saada26,80652.69%
|rowspan=2 |
|rowspan=2 |Richard Bélisle2,9735.84%
|rowspan=2 |
|rowspan=2 |Clémence Provencher8521.67%
|rowspan=2 |
|rowspan=2 |Sylvain St-Louis2,7835.47%
|
|Normand Chouinard (M-L)172 0.34%
|rowspan=2 |
|rowspan=2 |Jacques Saada
|-
|
|Sylvia Larrass (NLP)528 1.04%
|-
| style="background-color:whitesmoke" |Chambly
||
|Ghislain Lebel26,08449.94%
|
|Denis Caron17,40033.31%
|
|Gaétan Paquette2,7805.32%
|
|Darren O'Toole7691.47%
|
|Jacques Parenteau3,4486.60%
|
|Sébastien Duclos (Mar.)1,7513.35%
||
|Ghislain Lebel
|-
| style="background-color:whitesmoke" |Châteauguay
||
|Robert Lanctôt26,28447.12%
|
|Carole Marcil22,97241.18%
|
|Ricardo Lopez3,1205.59%
|
|Robert Lindblad6221.12%
|
|Réjeanne Rioux2,0413.66%
|
|Margaret Larrass (NLP)7431.33%
||
|Maurice Godin†
|-
|rowspan=2 style="background-color:whitesmoke" |Longueuil
|rowspan=2 |
|rowspan=2 |Caroline St-Hilaire20,86852.25%
|rowspan=2 |
|rowspan=2 |Sophie Joncas12,99132.53%
|rowspan=2 |
|rowspan=2 |Michel Minguy2,0665.17%
|rowspan=2 |
|rowspan=2 |Timothy Spurr6551.64%
|rowspan=2 |
|rowspan=2 |Richard Lafleur2,2105.53%
|
|Stéphane Chénier (M-L)183 0.46%
|rowspan=2 |
|rowspan=2 |Caroline St-Hilaire
|-
|
|David Fiset (Mar.)968 2.42%
|-
| style="background-color:whitesmoke" |Saint-Bruno—Saint-Hubert
||
|Pierrette Venne22,21743.98%
|
|Claude Leblanc19,74339.08%
|
|Jean Vézina3,3056.54%
|
|Marie Henretta1,0292.04%
|
|Otmane Brixi2,6735.29%
|
|Maryève Daigle (Mar.)1,5463.06%
||
|Pierrette Venne
|-
| style="background-color:whitesmoke" |Saint-Jean
||
|Claude Bachand22,68647.44%
|
|Joseph Khoury17,26236.09%
|
|Josée Coulombe3,1696.63%
|
|Julien Patenaude6981.46%
|
|Gérald L'Ecuyer2,7645.78%
|
|Marc St-Jean (Mar.)1,2462.61%
||
|Claude Bachand
|-
| style="background-color:whitesmoke" |Saint-Lambert
|
|Christian Picard16,51938.11%
||
|Yolande Thibeault19,67945.40%
|
|Nic Leblanc3,0667.07%
|
|
|
|Walter Stirling2,7046.24%
|
|Katherine Léveillé (Mar.)1,3773.18%
||
|Yolande Thibeault
|-
| style="background-color:whitesmoke" |Vaudreuil-Soulanges
|
|Éric Cimon17,58734.49%
||
|Nick Discepola26,29251.56%
|
|Dean Drysdale4,1888.21%
|
|Shaun G. Lynch9041.77%
|
|Stratos Psarianos2,0203.96%
|
|
||
|Nick Discepola
|-
| style="background-color:whitesmoke" |Verchères—Les Patriotes
||
|Stéphane Bergeron28,69652.29%
|
|Mark Provencher16,74030.50%
|
|Stéphane Désilets2,8705.23%
|
|Charles Bussières1,0741.96%
|
|Frédéric Grenier3,8597.03%
|
|Jonathan Bérubé (Mar.)1,6432.99%
||
|Stéphane BergeronVerchères
|-
|}

Eastern Montreal

|-
| style="background-color:whitesmoke" |Anjou—Rivière-des-Prairies
|
|Jacques Dagenais14,75530.35%
||
|Yvon Charbonneau28,13457.86%
|
|Gianni Chiazzese2,0054.12%
|
|Bruce Whelan6241.28%
|
|Michel Tanguay2,0344.18%
|
|
|
|Normand Néron9181.89%
|
|Hélène Héroux (M-L)1510.31%
||
|Yvon Charbonneau
|-
|rowspan=2 style="background-color:whitesmoke" |Hochelaga—Maisonneuve
|rowspan=2 |
|rowspan=2 |Réal Ménard21,25049.20%
|rowspan=2 |
|rowspan=2 |Louis Morena16,14337.38%
|rowspan=2 |
|rowspan=2 |Stephanie Morency1,5023.48%
|rowspan=2 |
|rowspan=2 |Milan Mirich7671.78%
|rowspan=2 |
|rowspan=2 |Benoit Harbec1,7514.05%
|rowspan=2 |
|rowspan=2 |
|rowspan=2 |
|rowspan=2 |Alex Néron1,2272.84%
|
|Pierre Bibeau (Comm.)274 0.63%
|rowspan=2 |
|rowspan=2 |Réal Ménard
|-
|
|Christine Dandenault (M-L)275 0.64%
|-
| style="background-color:whitesmoke" |Laurier—Sainte-Marie
||
|Gilles Duceppe23,47352.79%
|
|Jean Philippe Côté11,45125.75%
|
|Stéphane Prud'homme9602.16%
|
|Richard Chartier2,1114.75%
|
|Jean François Tessier1,8794.23%
|
|Dylan Perceval-Maxwell2,1694.88%
|
|Marc-Boris St-Maurice2,1564.85%
|
|Ginette Boutet (M-L)2690.60%
||
|Gilles Duceppe
|-
| style="background-color:whitesmoke" |Mercier
||
|Francine Lalonde24,75552.87%
|
|Normand Biron15,41632.93%
|
|J. Marc-Antoine Delsoin1,6843.60%
|
|Nicholas Vikander4801.03%
|
|Martin Gelgoot1,6293.48%
|
|Richard Savignac1,8133.87%
|
|Eric Duquette9372.00%
|
|Geneviève Royer (M-L)1040.22%
||
|Francine Lalonde
|-
|rowspan=2 style="background-color:whitesmoke" |Rosemont—Petite-Patrie
|rowspan=2 |
|rowspan=2 |Bernard Bigras23,31549.13%
|rowspan=2 |
|rowspan=2 |Claude Vigneault16,05233.83%
|rowspan=2 |
|rowspan=2 |Etienne Morin1,3542.85%
|rowspan=2 |
|rowspan=2 |Noémi Lo Pinto1,4172.99%
|rowspan=2 |
|rowspan=2 |Marc Bissonnette2,0064.23%
|rowspan=2 |
|rowspan=2 |Sébastien Chagnon-Jean1,4753.11%
|rowspan=2 |
|rowspan=2 |Claude Messier (Mar.)1,4863.13%
|
|Joanne Pritchard (NA)114 0.24%
|rowspan=2 |
|rowspan=2 |Bernard BigrasRosemont
|-
|
|Dorothy Sauras (Comm.)233 0.49%
|}

Western Montreal

|-
| style="background-color:whitesmoke" |Lac-Saint-Louis
|
|Guy Amyot3,9136.67%
||
|Clifford Lincoln43,51574.16%
|
|William F. Shaw4,2237.20%
|
|Erin Sikora1,4642.50%
|
|Daniel Gendron4,4117.52%
|
|
|
|Elena D'Apollonia1,0311.76%
|
|Garnet Colly (M-L)1190.20%
||
|Clifford Lincoln
|-
|rowspan=2 style="background-color:whitesmoke" |LaSalle—Émard
|rowspan=2 |
|rowspan=2 |Denis Martel11,80524.20%
|rowspan=2 |
|rowspan=2 |Paul Martin32,06965.75%
|rowspan=2 |
|rowspan=2 |Giuseppe Joe De Santis1,8063.70%
|rowspan=2 |
|rowspan=2 |David Bernans8371.72%
|rowspan=2 |
|rowspan=2 |Deepak T. Massand1,1112.28%
|rowspan=2 |
|rowspan=2 |
|rowspan=2 |
|rowspan=2 |Mathieux St-Cyr7651.57%
|
|Gilles Bigras (NLP)273 0.56%
|rowspan=2 |
|rowspan=2 |Paul Martin
|-
|
|Irma Ortiz (Comm.)107 0.22%
|-
|rowspan=2 style="background-color:whitesmoke" |Mount Royal
|rowspan=2 |
|rowspan=2 |Jean-Sebastien Houle1,7404.27%
|rowspan=2 |
|rowspan=2 |Irwin Cotler33,11881.24%
|rowspan=2 |
|rowspan=2 |Alex Gabanski1,4443.54%
|rowspan=2 |
|rowspan=2 |Maria Pia Chávez1,0342.54%
|rowspan=2 |
|rowspan=2 |Stephane Gelgoot2,4896.11%
|rowspan=2 |
|rowspan=2 |Jean-Claude Balu6811.67%
|rowspan=2 |
|rowspan=2 |
|
|Judith Chafoya (Comm.)140 0.34%
|rowspan=2 |
|rowspan=2 |Irwin Cotler
|-
|
|Ena Kahn (NLP)122 0.30%
|-
|rowspan=2 style="background-color:whitesmoke" |Notre-Dame-de-Grâce—Lachine
|rowspan=2 |
|rowspan=2 |Jeannine Ouellet8,44918.11%
|rowspan=2 |
|rowspan=2 |Marlene Jennings28,32860.72%
|rowspan=2 |
|rowspan=2 |Darrin Etcovich2,0224.33%
|rowspan=2 |
|rowspan=2 |Bruce Toombs2,2084.73%
|rowspan=2 |
|rowspan=2 |Kathy Megyery3,3527.19%
|rowspan=2 |
|rowspan=2 |Katie Graham1,0312.21%
|rowspan=2 |
|rowspan=2 |Grégoire Faber8971.92%
|
|Rachel Hoffman (M-L)159 0.34%
|rowspan=2 |
|rowspan=2 |Marlene Jennings
|-
|
|Michael Wilson (NLP)205 0.44%
|-
|rowspan=2 style="background-color:whitesmoke" |Outremont
|rowspan=2 |
|rowspan=2 |Amir Khadir11,15128.29%
|rowspan=2 |
|rowspan=2 |Martin Cauchon18,79647.68%
|rowspan=2 |
|rowspan=2 |Josée Duchesneau1,2833.25%
|rowspan=2 |
|rowspan=2 |Peter Graefe2,1995.58%
|rowspan=2 |
|rowspan=2 |Robert Archambault3,1908.09%
|rowspan=2 |
|rowspan=2 |Jan Schotte1,4783.75%
|rowspan=2 |
|rowspan=2 |Huguette Plourde1,0132.57%
|
|Louise Charron (M-L)194 0.49%
|rowspan=2 |
|rowspan=2 |Martin Cauchon
|-
|
|Pierre Smith (Comm.)118 0.30%
|-
| style="background-color:whitesmoke" |Pierrefonds—Dollard
|
|Sylvie Brousseau5,93710.99%
||
|Bernard Patry39,35772.85%
|
|Neil Drabkin3,4816.44%
|
|Adam Hodgins1,1092.05%
|
|John Profit2,9915.54%
|
|
|
|Jean-François Labrecque1,1492.13%
|
|
||
|Bernard Patry
|-
|rowspan=3 style="background-color:whitesmoke" |Saint-Laurent—Cartierville
|rowspan=3 |
|rowspan=3 |Yves Beauregard5,83813.07%
|rowspan=3 |
|rowspan=3 |Stéphane Dion32,86173.58%
|rowspan=3 |
|rowspan=3 |Kaddis R. Sidaros1,9094.27%
|rowspan=3 |
|rowspan=3 |Piper Elizabeth Huggins1,0702.40%
|rowspan=3 |
|rowspan=3 |J. Pierre Rouleau2,3085.17%
|rowspan=3 |
|rowspan=3 |
|rowspan=3 |
|rowspan=3 |
|
|Jean-Paul Bedard (M-L)234 0.52%
|rowspan=3 |
|rowspan=3 |Stéphane Dion
|-
|
|Oscar Chavez (Comm.)206 0.46%
|-
|
|Ken Fernandez (CAP)232 0.52%
|-
|rowspan=2 style="background-color:whitesmoke" |Verdun—Saint-Henri—Saint-Paul—Pointe Saint-Charles
|rowspan=2 |
|rowspan=2 |Pedro Utillano11,97629.37%
|rowspan=2 |
|rowspan=2 |Raymond Lavigne20,90551.27%
|rowspan=2 |
|rowspan=2 |Jacques Gendron2,0985.15%
|rowspan=2 |
|rowspan=2 |Matthew McLauchlin1,0032.46%
|rowspan=2 |
|rowspan=2 |Bernard Côté2,6706.55%
|rowspan=2 |
|rowspan=2 |Lorraine Ann Craig9332.29%
|rowspan=2 |
|rowspan=2 |Marc-André Roy9242.27%
|
|William Lorensen (NA)117 0.29%
|rowspan=2 |
|rowspan=2 |Raymond LavigneVerdun—Saint-Henri
|-
|
|Bill Sloan (Comm.)148 0.36%
|-
|rowspan=3 style="background-color:whitesmoke" |Westmount—Ville-Marie
|rowspan=3 |
|rowspan=3 |Marcela Valdivia4,11010.71%
|rowspan=3 |
|rowspan=3 |Lucienne Robillard23,09360.19%
|rowspan=3 |
|rowspan=3 |Felix Cotte1,6974.42%
|rowspan=3 |
|rowspan=3 |Willy Blomme1,9905.19%
|rowspan=3 |
|rowspan=3 |Bryan Price4,59711.98%
|rowspan=3 |
|rowspan=3 |Brian Sarwer-Foner1,2453.25%
|rowspan=3 |
|rowspan=3 |Patrice Caron6921.80%
|
|Saroj Bains (M-L)150 0.39%
|rowspan=3 |
|rowspan=3 |Lucienne Robillard
|-
|
|Allen Faguy (NLP)96 0.25%
|-
|
|Michel Laporte (NA)694 1.81%
|-
|}

Northern Montreal and Laval

|-
| style="background-color:whitesmoke" |Ahuntsic
|
|Fatima El Amraoui17,13232.23%
||
|Eleni Bakopanos28,64353.89%
|
|Eugenia Romain1,8163.42%
|
|Steve Moran9971.88%
|
|Jessica Chartrand3,0185.68%
|
|Mimi Ghosh1,1232.11%
|
|Vincent Dorais1590.30%
|
|Antonio Artuso (Comm.)2620.49%
||
|Eleni Bakopanos
|-
| style="background-color:whitesmoke" |Bourassa
|
|Umberto Di Genova11,46228.07%
||
|Denis Coderre25,40362.22%
|
|Marcel Lys François1,4353.51%
|
|Richard Gendron7361.80%
|
|Marcel Pitre1,3253.25%
|
|
|
|Claude Brunelle3300.81%
|
|Ulises Nitor (Comm.)1370.34%
||
|Denis Coderre
|-
| style="background-color:whitesmoke" |Laval Centre
||
|Madeleine Dalphond-Guiral23,74643.35%
|
|Pierre Lafleur23,70443.27%
|
|Eric Marchand2,4374.45%
|
|Jean-Yves Dion8321.52%
|
|Guy Fortin2,7785.07%
|
|Julien Bernard1,2852.35%
|
|
|
|
||
|Madeleine Dalphond-Guiral
|-
|rowspan=2 style="background-color:whitesmoke" |Laval East
|rowspan=2 |
|rowspan=2 |Mathieu Alarie24,72642.55%
|rowspan=2 |
|rowspan=2 |Carole-Marie Allard26,01844.77%
|rowspan=2 |
|rowspan=2 |Rosane Raymond2,3544.05%
|rowspan=2 |
|rowspan=2 |Sujata Dey5730.99%
|rowspan=2 |
|rowspan=2 |André G. Plourde2,4594.23%
|rowspan=2 |
|rowspan=2 |Frédéric Gauvin6601.14%
|rowspan=2 |
|rowspan=2 |Gabriel Cornellier-Brunelle1780.31%
|
|Christian Lajoie (Mar.)892 1.53%
|rowspan=2 |
|rowspan=2 |Maud Debien†
|-
|
|Régent Millette (Ind.)255 0.44%
|-
| style="background-color:whitesmoke" |Laval West
|
|Manon Sauvé19,97532.27%
||
|Raymonde Folco31,75851.30%
|
|Leo Housakos4,6317.48%
|
|Christian Patenaude7641.23%
|
|Michael M. Fortier3,6135.84%
|
|Luc Beaulieu9831.59%
|
|Polyvios Tsakanikas1800.29%
|
|
||
|Raymonde Folco
|-
|rowspan=2 style="background-color:whitesmoke" |Papineau—Saint-Denis
|rowspan=2 |
|rowspan=2 |Philippe Ordenes11,77926.60%
|rowspan=2 |
|rowspan=2 |Pierre Pettigrew23,95554.10%
|rowspan=2 |
|rowspan=2 |Yannis Felemegos2,1144.77%
|rowspan=2 |
|rowspan=2 |Hans Marotte1,9834.48%
|rowspan=2 |
|rowspan=2 |Emmanuel Préville1,2152.74%
|rowspan=2 |
|rowspan=2 |Boris-Antoine Legault1,1282.55%
|rowspan=2 |
|rowspan=2 |Peter Macrisopoulos4821.09%
|
|Mustaque A. Sarker (Ind.)738 1.67%
|rowspan=2 |
|rowspan=2 |Pierre Pettigrew
|-
|
|Antoine Théorêt-Poupart (Mar.)886 2.00%
|-
| style="background-color:whitesmoke" |Saint-Léonard—Saint-Michel
|
|Marcel Ferlatte6,67914.47%
||
|Alfonso Gagliano35,39676.66%
|
|Daniel Champagne1,7503.79%
|
|Sara Mayo5281.14%
|
|Mostafa Ben Kirane1,0572.29%
|
|
|
|Yves Le Seigle1270.28%
|
|Karina Néron (Mar.)6351.38%
||
|Alfonso Gagliano
|}

Laurentides, Outaouais and Northern Quebec

|-
| style="background-color:whitesmoke" |Abitibi—Baie-James—Nunavik
|
|François Lemieux15,56742.76%
||
|Guy St-Julien18,19849.99%
|
|François Dionne1,2973.56%
|
|Daniel Fredrick5341.47%
|
|Sylvain Gemme8092.22%
|
|
|
|
||
|Guy St-JulienAbitibi
|-
|rowspan=3 style="background-color:whitesmoke" |Argenteuil—Papineau—Mirabel
|rowspan=3 |
|rowspan=3 |Mario Laframboise21,71343.20%
|rowspan=3 |
|rowspan=3 |Lise Bourgault21,17142.12%
|rowspan=3 |
|rowspan=3 |Francine Labelle2,8975.76%
|rowspan=3 |
|rowspan=3 |Didier Charles5501.09%
|rowspan=3 |
|rowspan=3 |Jean-Denis Pelletier1,8483.68%
|rowspan=3 |
|rowspan=3 |Marie-Thérèse Nault2560.51%
|
|Pierre Audette (Mar.)934 1.86%
|rowspan=3 |
|rowspan=3 |Maurice DumasArgenteuil—Papineau
|-
|
|Gilles Bisson (Green)723 1.44%
|-
|
|Laurent Filion (NA)1670.33%
|-
|rowspan=3 style="background-color:whitesmoke" |Gatineau
|rowspan=3 |
|rowspan=3 |Richard Nadeau12,81725.40%
|rowspan=3 |
|rowspan=3 |Mark Assad25,96051.45%
|rowspan=3 |
|rowspan=3 |Stéphany Crowley5,06910.05%
|rowspan=3 |
|rowspan=3 |Carl Hétu1,7633.49%
|rowspan=3 |
|rowspan=3 |Michael F. Vasseur3,6197.17%
|rowspan=3 |
|rowspan=3 |Jean-Claude Pommet4720.94%
|
|Ronald Bélanger (Ind.)389 0.77%
|rowspan=3 |
|rowspan=3 |Mark Assad
|-
|
|Samantha Demers (NA)228 0.45%
|-
|
|Françoise Roy (M-L)1390.28%
|-
|rowspan=4 style="background-color:whitesmoke" |Hull—Aylmer
|rowspan=4 |
|rowspan=4 |Caroline Brouard10,05123.08%
|rowspan=4 |
|rowspan=4 |Marcel Proulx22,38551.40%
|rowspan=4 |
|rowspan=4 |Michel Geisterfer3,6398.36%
|rowspan=4 |
|rowspan=4 |Peter Piening1,5213.49%
|rowspan=4 |
|rowspan=4 |Guy Dufort4,1819.60%
|rowspan=4 |
|rowspan=4 |Rita Bouchard4260.98%
|
|Robert Brooks (CAP)167 0.38%
|rowspan=4 |
|rowspan=4 |Marcel Proulx
|-
|
|Ron Gray (NA)1840.42%
|-
|
|Alexandre Legeais (M-L)106 0.24%
|-
|
|Aubert Martins (Mar.)892 2.05%
|-
| style="background-color:whitesmoke" |Laurentides
||
|Monique Guay30,33749.90%
|
|Dominique Boyer23,61938.85%
|
|William Azeff2,2693.73%
|
|Brendan Naef7201.18%
|
|Jacques Vien3,0945.09%
|
|Jacinthe Millaire7571.25%
|
|
||
|Monique Guay
|-
|rowspan=3 style="background-color:whitesmoke" |Pontiac—Gatineau—Labelle
|rowspan=3 |
|rowspan=3 |Johanne Deschamps14,55232.06%
|rowspan=3 |
|rowspan=3 |Robert Bertrand20,59045.36%
|rowspan=3 |
|rowspan=3 |Judith Grant6,58714.51%
|rowspan=3 |
|rowspan=3 |Melissa Hunter8401.85%
|rowspan=3 |
|rowspan=3 |Benoit Larocque1,7913.95%
|rowspan=3 |
|rowspan=3 |Eleanor Hyodo1840.41%
|
|Christian Legeais (M-L)93 0.20%
|rowspan=3 |
|rowspan=3 |Robert Bertrand
|-
|
|Thomas J. Sabourin (NA)98 0.22%
|-
|
|Gretchen Schwarz (Green)654 1.44%
|-
| style="background-color:whitesmoke" |Rivière-des-Mille-Îles
||
|Gilles-A. Perron26,50849.41%
|
|Robert Fragasso18,45634.40%
|
|François Desrochers3,6776.85%
|
|Stephane Thinel7391.38%
|
|Jonathan Paquette2,9355.47%
|
|
|
|Eric Squire (Green)1,3292.48%
||
|Gilles PerronSaint-Eustache—Sainte-Thérèse
|-
| style="background-color:whitesmoke" |Témiscamingue
||
|Pierre Brien18,80150.14%
|
|Roch Charron16,02842.75%
|
|Eric Larochelle1,3683.65%
|
|Anik-Maude Morin4931.31%
|
|Sébastien Héroux8042.14%
|
|
|
|
||
|Pierre Brien
|-
| style="background-color:whitesmoke" |Terrebonne—Blainville
||
|Diane Bourgeois28,93351.91%
|
|François-Hugues Liberge17,66831.70%
|
|Guylaine St-Georges3,7416.71%
|
|Normand Beaudet1,1111.99%
|
|Mélanie Gemme3,0895.54%
|
|Pascale Levert1,1932.14%
|
|
||
|Paul Mercier
|-
|}

Ontario

Ottawa

	
|-
| style="background-color:whitesmoke" |Nepean—Carleton
||
|David Pratt24,57041.16%
|
|Michael Green22,31037.37%
|
|Craig Parsons2,2233.72%
|
|Bill Knott9,53615.98%
|
|Isobel McGregor8051.35%
|
|
|
|Lester Newby1180.20%
|
|Jacques Waisvisz (CAP)1310.22%
||
|David Pratt
|-
|rowspan=3 style="background-color:whitesmoke" |Ottawa Centre
|rowspan=3 |
|rowspan=3 |Mac Harb22,71640.01%
|rowspan=3 |
|rowspan=3 |David Brown10,16717.91%
|rowspan=3 |
|rowspan=3 |Heather-jane Robertson13,51623.81%
|rowspan=3 |
|rowspan=3 |Beverley Mitchell7,50513.22%
|rowspan=3 |
|rowspan=3 |Chris Bradshaw1,5312.70%
|rowspan=3 |
|rowspan=3 |Brad Powers8131.43%
|rowspan=3 |
|rowspan=3 |Neil Paterson1110.20%
|
|Mistahi Corkill (M-L)66 0.12%
|rowspan=3 |
|rowspan=3 style="text-align:left;" |Mac Harb
|-
|
|Carla Marie Dancey (CAP)210 0.37%
|-
|
|Marvin Glass (Comm.)139 0.24%
|-
|rowspan=2 style="background-color:whitesmoke" |Ottawa—Orléans
|rowspan=2 |
|rowspan=2 |Eugène Bellemare26,63551.01%
|rowspan=2 |
|rowspan=2 |Rita Burke13,31625.50%
|rowspan=2 |
|rowspan=2 |Maureen Prebinski2,1694.15%
|rowspan=2 |
|rowspan=2 |Marc-André Bélair8,73816.73%
|rowspan=2 |
|rowspan=2 |Richard Warman5611.07%
|rowspan=2 |
|rowspan=2 |John Albert5341.02%
|rowspan=2 |
|rowspan=2 |Heather Hanson1170.22%
|
|Louis Lang (M-L)41 0.08%
|rowspan=2 |
|rowspan=2 |Eugène Bellemare
|-
|
|Jean Saintonge (CAP)108 0.21%
|-
|rowspan=2 style="background-color:whitesmoke" |Ottawa South
|rowspan=2 |
|rowspan=2 |John Manley26,58551.33%
|rowspan=2 |
|rowspan=2 |Brad Darbyson12,67724.48%
|rowspan=2 |
|rowspan=2 |Jeannie Page3,4636.69%
|rowspan=2 |
|rowspan=2 |Kevin Lister8,09615.63%
|rowspan=2 |
|rowspan=2 |
|rowspan=2 |
|rowspan=2 |Ron Whalen6791.31%
|rowspan=2 |
|rowspan=2 |James Hea1410.27%
|
|Marsha Fine (M-L)80 0.15%
|rowspan=2 |
|rowspan=2 |John Manley
|-
|
|Mick Panesar (Comm.)69 0.13%
|-
|rowspan=2 style="background-color:whitesmoke" |Ottawa—Vanier
|rowspan=2 |
|rowspan=2 |Mauril Bélanger26,74955.56%
|rowspan=2 |
|rowspan=2 |Nestor Gayowsky7,60015.79%
|rowspan=2 |
|rowspan=2 |Joseph Zebrowski4,1948.71%
|rowspan=2 |
|rowspan=2 |Stephen Woollcombe7,40015.37%
|rowspan=2 |
|rowspan=2 |Adam Sommerfeld1,0832.25%
|rowspan=2 |
|rowspan=2 |Raymond Turmel7281.51%
|rowspan=2 |
|rowspan=2 |Pierrette Blondin1870.39%
|
|Kim Roberge (M-L)74 0.15%
|rowspan=2 |
|rowspan=2 |Mauril Bélanger
|-
|
|Raymond Samuéls (CAP)126 0.26%
|-
|rowspan=3 style="background-color:whitesmoke" |Ottawa West—Nepean
|rowspan=3 |
|rowspan=3 |Marlene Catterall22,60643.32%
|rowspan=3 |
|rowspan=3 |Barry Yeates14,75328.27%
|rowspan=3 |
|rowspan=3 |Kevin Kinsella2,7185.21%
|rowspan=3 |
|rowspan=3 |Tom Curran10,50720.13%
|rowspan=3 |
|rowspan=3 |Matt Takach5851.12%
|rowspan=3 |
|rowspan=3 |Sotos Petrides4230.81%
|rowspan=3 |
|rowspan=3 |Richard Michael Wolfson580.11%
|
|David Creighton (CAP)376 0.72%
|rowspan=3 |
|rowspan=3 |Marlene Catterall
|-
|
|Stuart Ryan (Comm.)70 0.13%
|-
|
|John Turmel (Ind.)89 0.17%
|}

Eastern Ontario

|-
| style="background-color:whitesmoke" |Glengarry—Prescott—Russell
||
|Don Boudria31,37167.96%
|
|L. Sebastian Anders8,63218.70%
|
|Guy Belle-Isle1,8774.07%
|
|Ashley O'Kurley3,9428.54%
|
|
|
|Wayne Foster (NLP)3400.74%
||
|Don Boudria
|-
|rowspan=3 style="background-color:whitesmoke" |Hastings—Frontenac—Lennox and Addington
|rowspan=3 |
|rowspan=3 |Larry McCormick16,99639.00%
|rowspan=3 |
|rowspan=3 |Sean McAdam13,22730.35%
|rowspan=3 |
|rowspan=3 |Tom O'Neill2,2005.05%
|rowspan=3 |
|rowspan=3 |Daryl Kramp10,23123.48%
|rowspan=3 |
|rowspan=3 |Paul Isaacs (CAP)1560.36%
|
|Ross Baker (Ind.)207 0.48%
|rowspan=3 |
|rowspan=3 |Larry McCormick
|-
|
|Kenneth Switzer (NA)43 0.10%
|-
|
|Chris Walker (Green)516 1.18%
|-
| style="background-color:whitesmoke" |Kingston and the Islands
||
|Peter Milliken26,45751.69%
|
|Kevin Goligher7,90415.44%
|
|Gary Wilson4,9519.67%
|
|Blair MacLean9,22218.02%
|
|
|
|Chris Milburn (Green)2,6525.18%
||
|Peter Milliken
|-
|rowspan=3 style="background-color:whitesmoke" |Lanark—Carleton
|rowspan=3 |
|rowspan=3 |Ian Murray22,81135.99%
|rowspan=3 |
|rowspan=3 |Scott Reid24,67038.93%
|rowspan=3 |
|rowspan=3 |Theresa Kiefer1,9463.07%
|rowspan=3 |
|rowspan=3 |Bryan Brulotte12,43019.61%
|rowspan=3 |
|rowspan=3 |Ross Elliott (CAP)3880.61%
|
|John Baranyi (Ind.)150 0.24%
|rowspan=3 |
|rowspan=3 |Ian Murray
|-
|
|Stuart Langstaff (Green)871 1.37%
|-
|
|Britt Roberts (NLP)107 0.17%
|-
| style="background-color:whitesmoke" |Leeds—Grenville
||
|Joe Jordan18,59439.51%
|
|Gord Brown18,53939.39%
|
|Martin Hanratty9902.10%
|
|John M. Johnston7,94016.87%
|
|Jane Pamela Scharf (CAP)1810.38%
|
|Jerry Heath (Green)8161.73%
||
|Joe Jordan
|-
| style="background-color:whitesmoke" |Prince Edward—Hastings
||
|Lyle Vanclief20,05550.46%
|
|Jim Graham9,70724.43%
|
|Jason Gannon1,8974.77%
|
|Dennis Timbrell8,08320.34%
|
|
|
|
||
|Lyle Vanclief
|-
|rowspan=3 style="background-color:whitesmoke" |Renfrew—Nipissing—Pembroke
|rowspan=3 |
|rowspan=3 |Hec Clouthier18,21139.00%
|rowspan=3 |
|rowspan=3 |Cheryl Gallant20,63444.18%
|rowspan=3 |
|rowspan=3 |Ole Hendrickson1,6073.44%
|rowspan=3 |
|rowspan=3 |Bob Amaron5,28711.32%
|rowspan=3 |
|rowspan=3 |
|
|André Giordano (NLP)78 0.17%
|rowspan=3 |
|rowspan=3 |Hec Clouthier
|-
|
|Thane C. Heins (NA)121 0.26%
|-
|
|Stanley E. Sambey (Mar.)762 1.63%
|-
| style="background-color:whitesmoke" |Stormont—Dundas—Charlottenburgh
||
|Bob Kilger19,11346.69%
|
|Guy Lauzon16,15139.45%
|
|Kimberley Fry1,6964.14%
|
|Michael Bailey3,6358.88%
|
|Georges Elie Novy (CAP)1270.31%
|
|Ian Campbell (NLP)2140.52%
||
|Bob Kilger
|-
|}

Central Ontario

|-
|rowspan=2 style="background-color:whitesmoke" |Barrie—Simcoe—Bradford
|rowspan=2 |
|rowspan=2 |Aileen Carroll26,30948.27%
|rowspan=2 |
|rowspan=2 |Rob Hamilton17,60032.29%
|rowspan=2 |
|rowspan=2 |Keith Lindsay2,3854.38%
|rowspan=2 |
|rowspan=2 |Jane MacLaren7,58813.92%
|
|Brian K. White (NA)234 0.43%
|rowspan=2 |
|rowspan=2 |Aileen Carroll
|-
|
|Ian Woods (CAP)387 0.71%
|-
| style="background-color:whitesmoke" |Bruce—Grey—Owen Sound
||
|Ovid L. Jackson19,81744.22%
|
|Murray Peer15,96035.61%
|
|Karen Gventer2,1664.83%
|
|Allen Wilford6,87215.33%
|
|
||
|Ovid Jackson
|-
| style="background-color:whitesmoke" |Dufferin—Peel—Wellington—Grey
||
|Murray Calder21,67845.57%
|
|Don Crawford15,02831.59%
|
|Mitchel Healey1,4733.10%
|
|Richard Majkot7,92616.66%
|
|Robert Strang (Green)1,4643.08%
||
|Murray Calder
|-
| style="background-color:whitesmoke" |Durham
||
|Alex Shepherd20,60245.20%
|
|Gerry Skipwith13,74330.15%
|
|Ken Ranney2,5455.58%
|
|Sam Cureatz8,36718.36%
|
|Durk Bruinsma (NA)3260.72%
||
|Alex Shepherd
|-
| style="background-color:whitesmoke" |Haliburton—Victoria—Brock
||
|John O'Reilly16,71033.95%
|
|Pat Dunn15,59131.68%
|
|Rick Denyer2,4094.89%
|
|Laurie Scott14,50829.48%
|
|
||
|John O'Reilly
|-
|rowspan=2 style="background-color:whitesmoke" |Northumberland
|rowspan=2 |
|rowspan=2 |Paul Harold Macklin20,10945.90%
|rowspan=2 |
|rowspan=2 |Rick Norlock11,41026.05%
|rowspan=2 |
|rowspan=2 |Ben Burd2,1414.89%
|rowspan=2 |
|rowspan=2 |Ralph James Zarboni8,76820.02%
|
|Tom Lawson (Green)1,102 2.52%
|rowspan=2 |
|rowspan=2 |Christine Stewart
|-
|
|Gail Thompson (CAP)276 0.63%
|-
|rowspan=2 style="background-color:whitesmoke" |Peterborough
|rowspan=2 |
|rowspan=2 |Peter Adams25,31048.41%
|rowspan=2 |
|rowspan=2 |Eric John Allan Mann14,92428.54%
|rowspan=2 |
|rowspan=2 |Herb Wiseman3,9677.59%
|rowspan=2 |
|rowspan=2 |Darrin Langen7,03413.45%
|
|Bob Bowers (Ind.)147 0.28%
|rowspan=2 |
|rowspan=2 |Peter Adams
|-
|
|Tim Holland (Green)903 1.73%
|-
|rowspan=2 style="background-color:whitesmoke" |Simcoe—Grey
|rowspan=2 |
|rowspan=2 |Paul Bonwick22,22444.77%
|rowspan=2 |
|rowspan=2 |George Demery16,11332.46%
|rowspan=2 |
|rowspan=2 |Michael Kennedy1,6463.32%
|rowspan=2 |
|rowspan=2 |Bill Dunkley8,65517.44%
|
|Victor Carvalho (NA)246 0.50%
|rowspan=2 |
|rowspan=2 |Paul Bonwick
|-
|
|James Wilson McGillivray (CAP)751 1.51%
|-
| style="background-color:whitesmoke" |Simcoe North
||
|Paul DeVillers24,51050.76%
|
|Peter Stock14,28329.58%
|
|Ann Billings2,2724.71%
|
|Lucy Stewart6,91414.32%
|
|Adrian P. Kooger (NA)3050.63%
||
|Paul Devillers
|-
| style="background-color:whitesmoke" |York North
||
|Karen Kraft Sloan22,66546.50%
|
|Bob Yaciuk11,98524.59%
|
|Ian Scott1,6963.48%
|
|Joe Wamback11,89024.39%
|
|Ian Knight (NA)5091.04%
||
|Karen Kraft Sloan
|-
|}

Durham and York

|-
|rowspan=3 style="background-color:whitesmoke" |Markham
|rowspan=3 |
|rowspan=3 |John McCallum32,10466.64%
|rowspan=3 |
|rowspan=3 |Jim Jones9,01518.71%
|rowspan=3 |
|rowspan=3 |Janice Hagan1,1292.34%
|rowspan=3 |
|rowspan=3 |David Scrymgeour5,08510.55%
|
|Akber Choudhry (Ind.)222 0.46%
|rowspan=3 |
|rowspan=3 |Jim Jones
|-
|
|Jim Conrad (CAP)130 0.27%
|-
|
|Bernadette Manning (Green)493 1.02%
|-
|rowspan=2 style="background-color:whitesmoke" |Oak Ridges
|rowspan=2 |
|rowspan=2 |Bryon Wilfert33,05859.41%
|rowspan=2 |
|rowspan=2 |Bob Callow11,71421.05%
|rowspan=2 |
|rowspan=2 |Joseph Thevarkunnel1,6232.92%
|rowspan=2 |
|rowspan=2 |John Oostrom8,40915.11%
|
|Steven Haylestrom (Green)672 1.21%
|rowspan=2 |
|rowspan=2 |Bryon Wilfert
|-
|
|Mary Wan (NLP)172 0.31%
|-
|rowspan=2 style="background-color:whitesmoke" |Oshawa
|rowspan=2 |
|rowspan=2 |Ivan Grose16,17942.92%
|rowspan=2 |
|rowspan=2 |Barry Bussey10,86328.82%
|rowspan=2 |
|rowspan=2 |Bruce Rogers4,20311.15%
|rowspan=2 |
|rowspan=2 |Bruce L. Wright5,67515.05%
|
|David Gershuny (M-L)97 0.26%
|rowspan=2 |
|rowspan=2 |Ivan Grose
|-
|
|Craig James Michael McMillan (Mar.)679 1.80%
|-
| style="background-color:whitesmoke" |Pickering—Ajax—Uxbridge
||
|Dan McTeague28,83457.44%
|
|Ken Griffith11,94123.79%
|
|Ralph Chatoor1,5233.03%
|
|Michael Hills6,88313.71%
|
|Chris Pennington (Green)1,0142.02%
||
|Dan McTeague
|-
| style="background-color:whitesmoke" |Thornhill
||
|Elinor Caplan27,15264.59%
|
|Robert Goldin6,64315.80%
|
|Nathan Rotman1,6533.93%
|
|Lou Watson6,33815.08%
|
|Art Jaszczyk (CAP)2540.60%
||
|Elinor Caplan
|-
| style="background-color:whitesmoke" |Vaughan—King—Aurora
||
|Maurizio Bevilacqua38,20867.22%
|
|Adrian Visentin9,75717.17%
|
|Octavia Beckles1,9383.41%
|
|Menotti Mazzuca6,55111.53%
|
|Lesley Knight (NA)3840.68%
||
|Maurizio Bevilacqua
|-
| style="background-color:whitesmoke" |Whitby—Ajax
||
|Judi Longfield25,69352.68%
|
|Shaun Gillespie13,15926.98%
|
|Vic Perroni2,3594.84%
|
|Rob Chopowick7,56315.51%
|
|
||
|Judi Longfield
|}

Suburban Toronto

|-
| style="background-color:whitesmoke" |Don Valley East
||
|David Collenette25,91566.60%
|
|Kasra Nejatian4,73612.17%
|
|Ron Casey-Nestor2,2495.78%
|
|Cecilia Fusco5,64514.51%
|
|Judith Snow1530.39%
|
|Ryan Kidd (NA)2120.54%
||
|David Collenette
|-
| style="background-color:whitesmoke" |Etobicoke Centre
||
|Allan Rock26,08356.37%
|
|Michael G. Craik10,31822.30%
|
|Karen Dolan2,1244.59%
|
|Ross Vaughan7,56616.35%
|
|Dagmar Sullivan1810.39%
|
|
||
|Allan Rock
|-
|rowspan=2 style="background-color:whitesmoke" |Etobicoke—Lakeshore
|rowspan=2 |
|rowspan=2 |Jean Augustine22,46751.78%
|rowspan=2 |
|rowspan=2 |David Court9,16021.11%
|rowspan=2 |
|rowspan=2 |Richard Joseph Banigan2,8356.53%
|rowspan=2 |
|rowspan=2 |David Haslam8,45319.48%
|rowspan=2 |
|rowspan=2 |Janice Murray1160.27%
|
|Ed Bil (Comm.)113 0.26%
|rowspan=2 |
|rowspan=2 |Jean Augustine
|-
|
|Don Jackson (NLP)244 0.56%
|-
| style="background-color:whitesmoke" |Etobicoke North
||
|Roy Cullen23,34572.54%
|
|Mahmood Elahi6,28019.51%
|
|Ana Maria Sapp2,2106.87%
|
|
|
|
|
|Elizabeth Rowley (Comm.)3471.08%
||
|Roy Cullen
|-
| style="background-color:whitesmoke" |Scarborough—Agincourt
||
|Jim Karygiannis26,98670.89%
|
|Andrew Faust5,10013.40%
|
|Michael Laxer1,4993.94%
|
|Bruce Elliott4,03010.59%
|
|Sarah Thompson1120.29%
|
|Wayne Cook (CAP)3410.90%
||
|Jim Karygiannis
|-
| style="background-color:whitesmoke" |Scarborough Centre
||
|John Cannis26,96967.51%
|
|Bill Settatree8,84922.15%
|
|Ali Mallah3,1717.94%
|
|
|
|
|
|Paul Coulbeck (Mar.)9592.40%
||
|John Cannis
|-
| style="background-color:whitesmoke" |Scarborough East
||
|John McKay24,01959.82%
|
|Paul Calandra7,55918.83%
|
|Denise Lake1,8844.69%
|
|W. Paul McCrossan6,28415.65%
|
|France Tremblay1130.28%
|
|Dave Glover (CAP)2920.73%
||
|John McKay
|-
| style="background-color:whitesmoke" |Scarborough—Rouge River
||
|Derek Lee28,66979.05%
|
|Kaizer Suleman3,2378.93%
|
|Paulette Senior1,7934.94%
|
|Alan Shumak2,5667.08%
|
|
|
|
||
|Derek Lee
|-
|rowspan=2 style="background-color:whitesmoke" |Scarborough Southwest
|rowspan=2 |
|rowspan=2 |Tom Wappel21,46660.01%
|rowspan=2 |
|rowspan=2 |Nabil El-Khazen4,91213.73%
|rowspan=2 |
|rowspan=2 |Dan Harris3,63810.17%
|rowspan=2 |
|rowspan=2 |Ellery Hollingsworth5,25114.68%
|rowspan=2 |
|rowspan=2 |
|
|Walter Aolari (CAP)336 0.94%
|rowspan=2 |
|rowspan=2 |Tom Wappel
|-
|
|Dora Stewart (Comm.)165 0.46%
|-
| style="background-color:whitesmoke" |Willowdale
||
|Jim Peterson27,03861.27%
|
|Kevyn Nightingale7,41116.79%
|
|Yvonne Bobb2,4045.45%
|
|Chungsen Leung7,13416.17%
|
|Roger Carter1450.33%
|
|
||
|Jim Peterson
|-
|rowspan=2 style="background-color:whitesmoke" |York Centre
|rowspan=2 |
|rowspan=2 |Art Eggleton24,78871.09%
|rowspan=2 |
|rowspan=2 |Jeffrey Dorfman4,61513.24%
|rowspan=2 |
|rowspan=2 |Maurice Coulter2,1096.05%
|rowspan=2 |
|rowspan=2 |Mark Tweyman2,5187.22%
|rowspan=2 |
|rowspan=2 |Diane Johnston1420.41%
|
|Christopher Black (Comm.)163 0.47%
|rowspan=2 |
|rowspan=2 |Art Eggleton
|-
|
|Constantine Kritsonis (Green)532 1.53%
|-
| style="background-color:whitesmoke" |York West
||
|Judy Sgro19,76877.28%
|
|Munish Chandra2,73410.69%
|
|Julia McCrea2,3659.25%
|
|
|
|Amarjit Dhillon1750.68%
|
|G. Marcello Marchetti (Mar.)5392.11%
||
|Judy Sgro
|}

Central Toronto

|-
|rowspan=3 bgcolor=whitesmoke|Beaches—East York
|rowspan=3 |
|rowspan=3 |Maria Minna22,51552.74%
|rowspan=3 |
|rowspan=3 |Abu Alam3,8388.99%
|rowspan=3 |
|rowspan=3 |Mel Watkins8,93620.93%
|rowspan=3 |
|rowspan=3 |Wayne Clutterbuck5,76613.51%
|rowspan=3 |
|rowspan=3 |James Mendel5991.40%
|rowspan=3 |
|rowspan=3 |Bruce Watson6821.60%
|rowspan=3 |
|rowspan=3 |Steve Rutchinski530.12%
|
|Donalda Fredeen (NLP)88 0.21%
|rowspan=3 |
|rowspan=3 |Maria Minna
|-
|
|Ann Nicholson (Comm.)82 0.19%
|-
|
|Randall Whitcomb (CAP)128 0.30%
|-
|rowspan=2 bgcolor=whitesmoke|Davenport
|rowspan=2 |
|rowspan=2 |Charles Caccia17,01466.72%
|rowspan=2 |
|rowspan=2 |Anthony Montenegrino2,0217.93%
|rowspan=2 |
|rowspan=2 |Jordan Berger3,45713.56%
|rowspan=2 |
|rowspan=2 |Eduardo Marcos1,5265.98%
|rowspan=2 |
|rowspan=2 |Mark O'Brien6422.52%
|rowspan=2 |
|rowspan=2 |Elmer Gale4801.88%
|rowspan=2 |
|rowspan=2 |
|
|Ann Emmett (CAP)288 1.13%
|rowspan=2 |
|rowspan=2 |Charles Caccia†
|-
|
|Stephen Porter (NLP)73 0.29%
|-
|bgcolor=whitesmoke|Don Valley West
||
|John Godfrey25,32955.37%
|
|John Wakelin7,23915.83%
|
|Ali Naqvi2,0244.42%
|
|Michael Murton10,58323.14%
|
|
|
|Greg Stock4691.03%
|
|Fernand Deschamps970.21%
|
|
||
|John Godfrey
|-
|bgcolor=whitesmoke|Eglinton—Lawrence
||
|Joe Volpe25,16160.68%
|
|Joel Etienne5,49713.26%
|
|Simon Rowland2,6636.42%
|
|Louise Sankey7,15617.26%
|
|Doug Howat6881.66%
|
|
|
|Frank Chilelli1640.40%
|
|Matthew Macleod (NLP)1330.32%
||
|Joe Volpe
|-
|rowspan=3 bgcolor=whitesmoke|Parkdale—High Park
|rowspan=3 |
|rowspan=3 |Sarmite Bulte20,67649.41%
|rowspan=3 |
|rowspan=3 |Vicki Vancas4,88211.67%
|rowspan=3 |
|rowspan=3 |Paul Schmidt7,94718.99%
|rowspan=3 |
|rowspan=3 |David Strycharz5,68113.58%
|rowspan=3 |
|rowspan=3 |Neil Spiegel1,1612.77%
|rowspan=3 |
|rowspan=3 |Terry Parker7751.85%
|rowspan=3 |
|rowspan=3 |Lorne Gershuny1220.29%
|
|Michel Dugré (NA)132 0.32%
|rowspan=3 |
|rowspan=3 |Sarmite Bulte
|-
|
|Greg Robertson (CAP)317 0.76%
|-
|
|Wilfred Szczesny (Comm.)155 0.37%
|-
|rowspan=2 bgcolor=whitesmoke|St. Paul's
|rowspan=2 |
|rowspan=2 |Carolyn Bennett25,35854.01%
|rowspan=2 |
|rowspan=2 |Theo Caldwell5,45711.62%
|rowspan=2 |
|rowspan=2 |Guy Hunter4,4519.48%
|rowspan=2 |
|rowspan=2 |Barry Cline10,09921.51%
|rowspan=2 |
|rowspan=2 |Don Roebuck7691.64%
|rowspan=2 |
|rowspan=2 |Andrew Potter5141.09%
|rowspan=2 |
|rowspan=2 |Barbara Seed880.19%
|
|Ron Parker (NLP)83 0.18%
|rowspan=2 |
|rowspan=2 |Carolyn Bennett
|-
|
|Mark Till (CAP)128 0.27%
|-
|rowspan=3 bgcolor=whitesmoke|Toronto Centre—Rosedale
|rowspan=3 |
|rowspan=3 |Bill Graham26,20355.33%
|rowspan=3 |
|rowspan=3 |Richard Walker5,05810.68%
|rowspan=3 |
|rowspan=3 |David Berlin5,30011.19%
|rowspan=3 |
|rowspan=3 |Randall Pearce8,14917.21%
|rowspan=3 |
|rowspan=3 |
|rowspan=3 |
|rowspan=3 |Neev Tapiero7221.52%
|rowspan=3 |
|rowspan=3 |Philip Fernandez1160.24%
|
|Danny Goldstick (Comm.)121 0.26%
|rowspan=3 |
|rowspan=3 |Bill Graham
|-
|
|David Gordon (NLP)224 0.47%
|-
|
|Paul Hellyer (CAP)1,466 3.10%
|-
|rowspan=3 bgcolor=whitesmoke|Toronto—Danforth
|rowspan=3 |
|rowspan=3 |Dennis Mills20,33051.90%
|rowspan=3 |
|rowspan=3 |Chris Butryn3,0217.71%
|rowspan=3 |
|rowspan=3 |Paula Turtle10,83027.65%
|rowspan=3 |
|rowspan=3 |Rose A. Dyson3,1388.01%
|rowspan=3 |
|rowspan=3 |Robert Nevin7691.96%
|rowspan=3 |
|rowspan=3 |Sean Keir5131.31%
|rowspan=3 |
|rowspan=3 |Melanie Cishecki820.21%
|
|Miguel Figueroa (Comm.)129 0.33%
|rowspan=3 |
|rowspan=3 |Dennis Mills
|-
|
|Linda Martin (NLP)154 0.39%
|-
|
|William Angus Millar (CAP)202 0.52%
|-
|rowspan=2 bgcolor=whitesmoke|Trinity—Spadina
|rowspan=2 |
|rowspan=2 |Tony Ianno20,03247.56%
|rowspan=2 |
|rowspan=2 |Lee Monaco2,2505.34%
|rowspan=2 |
|rowspan=2 |Michael Valpy16,00137.99%
|rowspan=2 |
|rowspan=2 |John E. Polko2,3095.48%
|rowspan=2 |
|rowspan=2 |Matthew Hammond5621.33%
|rowspan=2 |
|rowspan=2 |Paul Lewin6731.60%
|rowspan=2 |
|rowspan=2 |Nick Lin1020.24%
|
|Jesse Benjamin (Comm.)90 0.21%
|rowspan=2 |
|rowspan=2 |Tony Ianno
|-
|
|Ashley Deans (NLP)98 0.23%
|-
|rowspan=2 bgcolor=whitesmoke|York South—Weston
|rowspan=2 |
|rowspan=2 |Alan Tonks15,84145.60%
|rowspan=2 |
|rowspan=2 |Dan Houssar1,7545.05%
|rowspan=2 |
|rowspan=2 |Tom Parkin1,2883.71%
|rowspan=2 |
|rowspan=2 |Jason Daniel Baker9862.84%
|rowspan=2 |
|rowspan=2 |Denis Calnan2930.84%
|rowspan=2 |
|rowspan=2 |
|rowspan=2 |
|rowspan=2 |Anna Dicarlo1020.29%
|
|Hassan Husseini (Comm.)130 0.37%
|rowspan=2 |
|rowspan=2 |John Nunziata
|-
|
|John Nunziata (NA)14,344 41.29%
|}

Brampton, Mississauga and Oakville

|-
|rowspan=2 style="background-color:whitesmoke" |Bramalea—Gore—Malton—Springdale
|rowspan=2 |
|rowspan=2 |Gurbax S. Malhi21,91757.05%
|rowspan=2 |
|rowspan=2 |Gurdish Mangat7,21418.78%
|rowspan=2 |
|rowspan=2 |Vishnu Roche1,8644.85%
|rowspan=2 |
|rowspan=2 |Danny Varaich6,01915.67%
|rowspan=2 |
|rowspan=2 |
|rowspan=2 |
|rowspan=2 |David Greig2690.70%
|
|Jim Bridgewood (Comm.)350 0.91%
|rowspan=2 |
|rowspan=2 |Gurbax Malhi
|-
|
|Gurinder Malhi (Ind.)783 2.04%
|-
| style="background-color:whitesmoke" |Brampton Centre
||
|Sarkis Assadourian18,36550.64%
|
|Prabhat Kapur6,24717.23%
|
|Sue Slean1,7954.95%
|
|Beryl Ford9,22925.45%
|
|Andrew K. Roy6281.73%
|
|
|
|
||
|Sarkis Assadourian
|-
| style="background-color:whitesmoke" |Brampton West—Mississauga
||
|Colleen Beaumier31,04166.38%
|
|Hardial Sangha7,66616.39%
|
|Matt Harsant1,5673.35%
|
|W. Glenn Harewood5,95712.74%
|
|Mike Hofer5291.13%
|
|
|
|
||
|Colleen Beaumier
|-
| style="background-color:whitesmoke" |Mississauga Centre
||
|Carolyn Parrish24,38164.13%
|
|Harry Dhaliwal6,64317.47%
|
|Gail McCabe1,4043.69%
|
|Nina Tangri5,07713.35%
|
|
|
|Bob McCabe1250.33%
|
|Alan Ward (Mar.)3891.02%
||
|Carolyn Parrish
|-
| style="background-color:whitesmoke" |Mississauga East
||
|Albina Guarnieri22,15864.50%
|
|Jainstien Dookie5,37215.64%
|
|Henry Beer1,4514.22%
|
|Riina DeFaria5,14414.97%
|
|
|
|Pierre Chénier2270.66%
|
|
||
|Albina Guarnieri
|-
| style="background-color:whitesmoke" |Mississauga South
||
|Paul Szabo20,67651.77%
|
|Brad Butt10,13925.39%
|
|Ken Cole1,6364.10%
|
|David Brown6,90317.28%
|
|Pamela Murray5161.29%
|
|Tim Sullivan670.17%
|
|
||
|Paul Szabo
|-
| style="background-color:whitesmoke" |Mississauga West
||
|Steve Mahoney31,26063.20%
|
|Philip Leong10,58221.40%
|
|Cynthia Kazadi1,5323.10%
|
|Gul Nawaz5,27510.67%
|
|Carolyn Brown8101.64%
|
|
|
|
||
|Steve Mahoney
|-
| style="background-color:whitesmoke" |Oakville
||
|M.A. Bonnie Brown23,07447.74%
|
|Dan Ferrone13,54428.02%
|
|Willie Lambert1,3352.76%
|
|Rick Byers9,58919.84%
|
|David deBelle7901.63%
|
|
|
|
||
|Bonnie Brown
|}

Hamilton, Burlington and Niagara

|-
| style="background-color:whitesmoke" |Ancaster—Dundas—Flamborough—Aldershot
||
|John Bryden19,92141.16%
|
|Ray Pennings15,27231.55%
|
|Gordon Guyatt3,7567.76%
|
|Gerry Aggus9,45119.53%
|
|
|
|
|
|
||
|John Bryden
|-
| style="background-color:whitesmoke" |Burlington
||
|Paddy Torsney22,17546.77%
|
|Don Pennell11,50024.26%
|
|Larry McMahon1,7223.63%
|
|Stephen Collinson11,24023.71%
|
|
|
|
|
|Tom Snyder (Green)7711.63%
||
|Paddy Torsney
|-
|rowspan=2 style="background-color:whitesmoke" |Erie—Lincoln
|rowspan=2 |
|rowspan=2 |John Maloney17,05442.21%
|rowspan=2 |
|rowspan=2 |Dean Allison14,99237.11%
|rowspan=2 |
|rowspan=2 |Jody Di Bartolomeo2,4236.00%
|rowspan=2 |
|rowspan=2 |David Hurren5,17412.81%
|rowspan=2 |
|rowspan=2 |
|rowspan=2 |
|rowspan=2 |John Gregory1430.35%
|
|David W. Bylsma (NA)476 1.18%
|rowspan=2 |
|rowspan=2 |John Maloney
|-
|
|William Schleich (CAP)137 0.34%
|-
|rowspan=3 style="background-color:whitesmoke" |Hamilton East
|rowspan=3 |
|rowspan=3 |Sheila Copps16,43552.85%
|rowspan=3 |
|rowspan=3 |Joshua Conroy6,03919.42%
|rowspan=3 |
|rowspan=3 |Jim Stevenson4,11113.22%
|rowspan=3 |
|rowspan=3 |Steven Knight3,32110.68%
|rowspan=3 |
|rowspan=3 |Julie Gordon1050.34%
|rowspan=3 |
|rowspan=3 |Helene Darisse-Yildirim970.31%
|
|Michael Baldasaro (Mar.)575 1.85%
|rowspan=3 |
|rowspan=3 |Sheila Copps
|-
|
|Salvatore Sam Cino (Ind.)270 0.87%
|-
|
|Bob Mann (Comm.)144 0.46%
|-
| style="background-color:whitesmoke" |Hamilton Mountain
||
|Beth Phinney22,53650.91%
|
|Mike Scott9,62121.73%
|
|James Stephenson4,3879.91%
|
|John Smith7,46716.87%
|
|Rolf Gerstenberger2590.59%
|
|
|
|
||
|Beth Phinney
|-
|rowspan=4 style="background-color:whitesmoke" |Hamilton West
|rowspan=4 |
|rowspan=4 |Stan Keyes21,27352.72%
|rowspan=4 |
|rowspan=4 |Leon O'Connor7,29518.08%
|rowspan=4 |
|rowspan=4 |Catherine Hudson5,30013.13%
|rowspan=4 |
|rowspan=4 |Ron Blackie5,02412.45%
|rowspan=4 |
|rowspan=4 |Wendell Fields610.15%
|rowspan=4 |
|rowspan=4 |Rita Rassenberg940.23%
|
|Hamish Jamie Campbell (Green)616 1.53%
|rowspan=4 |
|rowspan=4 |Stan Keyes
|-
|
|Stephen Downey (NA)163 0.40%
|-
|
|Danielle Keir (Mar.)437 1.08%
|-
|
|Mike Mirza (Comm.)91 0.23%
|-
| style="background-color:whitesmoke" |Niagara Centre
||
|Tony Tirabassi21,64145.74%
|
|Bernie Law13,31328.14%
|
|Mike Grimaldi7,02914.86%
|
|Joe Atkinson4,89310.34%
|
|Ron Walker1490.31%
|
|
|
|Tom Prue (CAP)2900.61%
||
|Gilbert Parent†
|-
| style="background-color:whitesmoke" |Niagara Falls
||
|Gary Pillitteri17,90745.92%
|
|Mel Grunstein11,99930.77%
|
|Ed Booker2,3566.04%
|
|Tony Baldinelli6,07715.58%
|
|
|
|William Norman Amos1550.40%
|
|Clara Tarnoy (Green)5011.28%
||
|Gary Pillitteri
|-
| style="background-color:whitesmoke" |St. Catharines
||
|Walt Lastewka20,99244.93%
|
|Randy Taylor Dumont15,87133.97%
|
|John Bacher2,8786.16%
|
|Ken Atkinson6,52213.96%
|
|Elaine Couto930.20%
|
|Jim Morris2030.43%
|
|Tilly Bylsma (NA)1660.36%
||
|Walt Lastewka
|-
| style="background-color:whitesmoke" |Stoney Creek
||
|Tony Valeri24,15051.08%
|
|Doug Conley13,35428.25%
|
|Mark Davies3,0836.52%
|
|Grant Howell6,10212.91%
|
|Paul Lane1370.29%
|
|
|
|Phil Rose (CAP)4500.95%
||
|Tony Valeri
|}

Midwestern Ontario

|-
| style="background-color:whitesmoke" |Brant
||
|Jane Stewart24,06856.42%
|
|Chris Cattle10,95525.68%
|
|Dee Chisholm3,1267.33%
|
|Stephen Kun3,5808.39%
|
|Graeme Dunn4841.13%
|
|Mike Clancy4471.05%
|
|
||
|Jane Stewart
|-
|rowspan=2 style="background-color:whitesmoke" |Cambridge
|rowspan=2 |
|rowspan=2 |Janko Peric22,14846.60%
|rowspan=2 |
|rowspan=2 |Reg Petersen14,91531.38%
|rowspan=2 |
|rowspan=2 |Pam Wolf4,1118.65%
|rowspan=2 |
|rowspan=2 |John L. Housser5,98812.60%
|rowspan=2 |
|rowspan=2 |
|rowspan=2 |
|rowspan=2 |
|
|John G. Gots (NA)160 0.34%
|rowspan=2 |
|rowspan=2 |Janko Peric
|-
|
|Thomas Mitchell (NLP)210 0.44%
|-
|rowspan=2 style="background-color:whitesmoke" |Guelph—Wellington
|rowspan=2 |
|rowspan=2 |Brenda Chamberlain26,44048.19%
|rowspan=2 |
|rowspan=2 |Max Layton11,03720.12%
|rowspan=2 |
|rowspan=2 |Edward Pickersgill5,68510.36%
|rowspan=2 |
|rowspan=2 |Marie Adsett10,18818.57%
|rowspan=2 |
|rowspan=2 |Bill Hulet9661.76%
|rowspan=2 |
|rowspan=2 |Sharon Tanti2070.38%
|
|Manuel Couto (M-L)68 0.12%
|rowspan=2 |
|rowspan=2 |Brenda Chamberlain
|-
|
|Gord Truscott (NA)275 0.50%
|-
| style="background-color:whitesmoke" |Haldimand—Norfolk—Brant
||
|Bob Speller20,86746.82%
|
|Jim Maki15,41634.59%
|
|Norm Walpole2,1244.77%
|
|Gary Muntz5,76112.93%
|
|
|
|L. Scott Morgan3970.89%
|
|
||
|Bob Speller
|-
| style="background-color:whitesmoke" |Halton
||
|Julian Reed28,16847.27%
|
|Tim Dobson15,65626.27%
|
|Brenda Dolling2,6334.42%
|
|Tom Kilmer12,11420.33%
|
|Tom Adams1,0181.71%
|
|
|
|
||
|Julian Reed
|-
| style="background-color:whitesmoke" |Huron—Bruce
||
|Paul Steckle21,54749.91%
|
|Mark Beaven10,34323.96%
|
|Christine Kemp2,6696.18%
|
|Ken Kelly8,13818.85%
|
|
|
|Philip Holley2250.52%
|
|Dave Joslin (NA)2490.58%
||
|Paul Steckle
|-
| style="background-color:whitesmoke" |Kitchener Centre
||
|Karen Redman23,51152.84%
|
|Eloise Jantzi11,60326.08%
|
|Paul Royston3,0586.87%
|
|Steven Daniel Gadbois6,16213.85%
|
|
|
|
|
|Martin Suter (Comm.)1580.36%
||
|Karen Redman
|-
|rowspan=2 style="background-color:whitesmoke" |Kitchener—Waterloo
|rowspan=2 |
|rowspan=2 |Andrew Telegdi27,13250.34%
|rowspan=2 |
|rowspan=2 |Joshua Doig12,40223.01%
|rowspan=2 |
|rowspan=2 |Richard Walsh-Bowers4,3948.15%
|rowspan=2 |
|rowspan=2 |Brian Bourke8,62115.99%
|rowspan=2 |
|rowspan=2 |Jack MacAulay8091.50%
|rowspan=2 |
|rowspan=2 |Robert E. Cormier2730.51%
|
|Frank Ellis (NA)105 0.19%
|rowspan=2 |
|rowspan=2 |Andrew Telegdi
|-
|
|Christine Nugent (M-L)164 0.30%
|-
| style="background-color:whitesmoke" |Oxford
||
|John Finlay15,18135.55%
|
|Patricia Smith11,45526.82%
|
|Shawn Rouse2,2545.28%
|
|Dave MacKenzie13,05030.56%
|
|
|
|Alex Kreider2270.53%
|
|John Thomas Markus (NA)5361.26%
||
|John Baird Finlay
|-
| style="background-color:whitesmoke" |Perth—Middlesex
||
|John Alexander Richardson16,98840.37%
|
|Garnet Bloomfield9,78523.26%
|
|Sam Dinicol2,8006.65%
|
|Gary Schellenberger11,54527.44%
|
|Eric Eberhardt6891.64%
|
|Larry Carruthers1280.30%
|
|Tom Kroesbergen (NA)1410.34%
||
|John Richardson
|-
| style="background-color:whitesmoke" |Waterloo—Wellington
||
|Lynn Myers19,61943.66%
|
|John Reimer14,79732.93%
|
|Allan Douglas Strong1,8454.11%
|
|Michael Chong7,99917.80%
|
|Brent A. Bouteiller4320.96%
|
|
|
|Peter Ellis (NA)2490.55%
||
|Lynn Myers
|}

Southwestern Ontario

|-
|rowspan=2 style="background-color:whitesmoke" |Chatham-Kent—Essex
|rowspan=2 |
|rowspan=2 |Jerry Pickard20,08549.71%
|rowspan=2 |
|rowspan=2 |Sean Smart12,95732.07%
|rowspan=2 |
|rowspan=2 |Susan MacKay2,2095.47%
|rowspan=2 |
|rowspan=2 |Ryan Bailey4,15610.29%
|rowspan=2 |
|rowspan=2 |Bobby Clarke7151.77%
|rowspan=2 |
|rowspan=2 |
|
|Louis Duke (NA)73 0.18%
|rowspan=2 |
|rowspan=2 |Jerry Pickard
|-
|
|Dudley Smith (CAP)213 0.53%
|-
| style="background-color:whitesmoke" |Elgin—Middlesex—London
||
|Gar Knutson17,20241.02%
|
|Bill Walters15,49636.95%
|
|Tim McCallum2,3195.53%
|
|Delia Reiche6,08014.50%
|
|John R. Fisher4311.03%
|
|
|
|Ken DeVries (NA)4070.97%
||
|Gar Knutson
|-
| style="background-color:whitesmoke" |Essex
||
|Susan Whelan20,52444.33%
|
|Scott Cowan16,01934.60%
|
|Marion Overholt6,43113.89%
|
|Merrill Baker3,1756.86%
|
|
|
|Robert Cruise1520.33%
|
|
||
|Susan Whelan
|-
|rowspan=2 style="background-color:whitesmoke" |Lambton—Kent—Middlesex
|rowspan=2 |
|rowspan=2 |Rose-Marie Ur21,12448.95%
|rowspan=2 |
|rowspan=2 |Ron Young13,30230.83%
|rowspan=2 |
|rowspan=2 |Joyce Jolliffe1,8714.34%
|rowspan=2 |
|rowspan=2 |John Phair5,91813.71%
|rowspan=2 |
|rowspan=2 |Dan Valkos3410.79%
|rowspan=2 |
|rowspan=2 |
|
|Eva Cryderman (CAP)232 0.54%
|rowspan=2 |
|rowspan=2 |Rose-Marie Ur
|-
|
|Roger James (NA)365 0.85%
|-
| style="background-color:whitesmoke" |London—Fanshawe
||
|Pat O'Brien19,67754.81%
|
|Robert Vaughan7,99822.28%
|
|Andrew Sadler4,10711.44%
|
|Derrall Bellaire4,11911.47%
|
|
|
|
|
|
||
|Pat O'Brien
|-
| style="background-color:whitesmoke" |London North Centre
||
|Joe Fontana22,79551.46%
|
|Nancy Branscombe9,06220.46%
|
|Colleen Redmond3,9368.89%
|
|Lorie Johnson7,30516.49%
|
|Jeremy McNaughton6811.54%
|
|Albert Smith650.15%
|
|Tim Berg (Mar.)4531.02%
||
|Joe Fontana
|-
| style="background-color:whitesmoke" |London West
||
|Sue Barnes23,79449.37%
|
|Salim Mansur10,16221.09%
|
|George Goodlet3,5967.46%
|
|Jeff Lang9,78820.31%
|
|Jeremy Price6141.27%
|
|Margaret Villamizar800.17%
|
|Richard Goos (CAP)1610.33%
||
|Sue Barnes
|-
|rowspan=4 style="background-color:whitesmoke" |Sarnia—Lambton
|rowspan=4 |
|rowspan=4 |Roger Gallaway19,32950.97%
|rowspan=4 |
|rowspan=4 |Dave Christie11,20829.56%
|rowspan=4 |
|rowspan=4 |Glenn Sonier2,7357.21%
|rowspan=4 |
|rowspan=4 |Paul Bailey3,3208.76%
|rowspan=4 |
|rowspan=4 |Allan McKeown5141.36%
|rowspan=4 |
|rowspan=4 |Andre C. Vachon320.08%
|
|Ed Banninga (NA)356 0.94%
|rowspan=4 |
|rowspan=4 |Roger Gallaway
|-
|
|Shannon Bourke (NLP)92 0.24%
|-
|
|John Elliott (Ind.)189 0.50%
|-
|
|Rene Phillion (CAP)145 0.38%
|-
| style="background-color:whitesmoke" |Windsor—St. Clair
|
|Rick Limoges16,60039.87%
|
|Phillip Pettinato5,63913.55%
||
|Joe Comartin17,00140.84%
|
|Bruck Easton1,9064.58%
|
|Stephen Lockwood3900.94%
|
|Dale Woodyard950.23%
|
|
||
|Rick Limoges
|-
| style="background-color:whitesmoke" |Windsor West
||
|Herb Gray20,72954.21%
|
|Jeff Watson8,77722.96%
|
|John McGinlay6,08015.90%
|
|Ian West2,1165.53%
|
|
|
|Enver Villamizar2290.60%
|
|Christopher Soda (Ind.)3040.80%
||
|Herb Gray
|}

Northern Ontario

|-
| style="background-color:whitesmoke" |Algoma—Manitoulin
||
|Brent St. Denis15,00048.36%
|
|Ron Swain8,99228.99%
|
|Grant Buck4,32613.95%
|
|Dale Lapham2,2697.32%
|
|Alexander Jablanczy4281.38%
|
|
||
|Brent St. Denis
|-
| style="background-color:whitesmoke" |Kenora—Rainy River
||
|Bob Nault14,41645.21%
|
|Ed Prefontaine9,12528.62%
|
|Susan Barclay6,86821.54%
|
|Brian Barrett1,4764.63%
|
|
|
|
||
|Bob Nault
|-
| style="background-color:whitesmoke" |Nickel Belt
||
|Raymond Bonin19,18755.57%
|
|Neil Martin6,37018.45%
|
|Sandy Bass7,30421.16%
|
|Reg Couldridge1,6644.82%
|
|
|
|
||
|Raymond Bonin
|-
| style="background-color:whitesmoke" |Nipissing
||
|Bob Wood18,88857.04%
|
|Ken Ferron7,46122.53%
|
|Wendy Young2,5727.77%
|
|Alan Dayes4,19212.66%
|
|
|
|
||
|Bob Wood
|-
| style="background-color:whitesmoke" |Parry Sound—Muskoka
||
|Andy Mitchell17,91147.52%
|
|George Stripe9,56925.39%
|
|Joanne Bury1,6654.42%
|
|Keith Montgomery7,05518.72%
|
|Richard Thomas1,4953.97%
|
|
||
|Andy Mitchell
|-
| style="background-color:whitesmoke" |Sault Ste. Marie
||
|Carmen F. Provenzano18,86750.79%
|
|David Ronald Rose7,00618.86%
|
|Bud Wildman9,20224.77%
|
|Doug Lawson1,1683.14%
|
|Kathie Brosemer7762.09%
|
|Martin Bruce Odber (CAP)1280.34%
||
|Carmen Provenzano
|-
|rowspan=2 style="background-color:whitesmoke" |Sudbury
|rowspan=2 |
|rowspan=2 |Diane Marleau20,29058.52%
|rowspan=2 |
|rowspan=2 |Mike Smith6,55418.90%
|rowspan=2 |
|rowspan=2 |Paul Chislett4,36812.60%
|rowspan=2 |
|rowspan=2 |Alex McGregor2,6427.62%
|rowspan=2 |
|rowspan=2 |Thomas Gerry5031.45%
|
|Daryl Janet Shandro (Comm.)98 0.28%
|rowspan=2 |
|rowspan=2 |Diane Marleau
|-
|
|Kathy Wells-McNeil (CAP)215 0.62%
|-
| style="background-color:whitesmoke" |Thunder Bay—Atikokan
||
|Stan Dromisky11,44936.98%
|
|David Richard Leskowski9,06729.29%
|
|Rick Baker6,02319.45%
|
|Ian M. Sinclair3,65211.80%
|
|Kristin Boyer7692.48%
|
|
||
|Stan Dromisky
|-
| style="background-color:whitesmoke" |Thunder Bay—Superior North
||
|Joe Comuzzi15,24148.12%
|
|Doug Pantry6,27819.82%
|
|John Rafferty6,16919.48%
|
|Richard Neumann2,7538.69%
|
|Carl Rose6482.05%
|
|Denis A. Carrière (Mar.)5811.83%
||
|Joe Comuzzi
|-
| style="background-color:whitesmoke" |Timiskaming—Cochrane
||
|Ben Serré19,40462.40%
|
|Dan Louie5,84018.78%
|
|Ambrose Raftis2,4617.91%
|
|William J. Stairs2,6038.37%
|
|Joseph Gold7902.54%
|
|
||
|Benoit Serré
|-
| style="background-color:whitesmoke" |Timmins—James Bay
||
|Réginald Bélair16,33554.22%
|
|James Gibb3,35611.14%
|
|Len Wood9,38531.15%
|
|Daniel Clark1,0533.49%
|
|
|
|
||
|Réginald Bélair
|}

Manitoba

Rural Manitoba

|-
|rowspan=2 style="background-color:whitesmoke" |Brandon—Souris
|rowspan=2 |
|rowspan=2 |Dick Scott6,54417.86%
|rowspan=2 |
|rowspan=2 |Gary Nestibo11,67831.87%
|rowspan=2 |
|rowspan=2 |Errol Black4,51812.33%
|rowspan=2 |
|rowspan=2 |Rick Borotsik13,70737.41%
|
|Colin G. Atkins (NA)94 0.26%
|rowspan=2 |
|rowspan=2 |Rick Borotsik
|-
|
|Lisa Gallagher (Comm.)102 0.28%
|-
| style="background-color:whitesmoke" |Churchill
|
|Elijah Harper7,51432.23%
|
|Jason Shaw4,12617.70%
||
|Bev Desjarlais10,47744.94%
|
|Doreen Murray1,1985.14%
|
|

||
|Bev Desjarlais
|-
|rowspan=2 style="background-color:whitesmoke" |Dauphin—Swan River
|rowspan=2 |
|rowspan=2 |Jane Dawson7,09121.32%
|rowspan=2 |
|rowspan=2 |Inky Mark15,85547.66%
|rowspan=2 |
|rowspan=2 |Wayne Kines5,81317.47%
|rowspan=2 |
|rowspan=2 |Keith Eliasson3,94611.86%
|
|Terry Drul (CAP)372 1.12%
|rowspan=2 |
|rowspan=2 |Inky Mark
|-
|
|Iris Yawney (NA)189 0.57%
|-
| style="background-color:whitesmoke" |Portage—Lisgar
|
|Gerry J.E. Gebler6,13317.82%
||
|Brian William Pallister17,31850.31%
|
|Diane Beresford2,0736.02%
|
|Morley McDonald5,33915.51%
|
|E. Jake Hoeppner (Ind.)3,55810.34%
||
|Jake Hoeppner
|-
| style="background-color:whitesmoke" |Provencher
|
|David Iftody14,41935.62%
||
|Vic Toews21,35852.76%
|
|Peter Hiebert1,9804.89%
|
|Henry C. Dyck2,7266.73%
|
|
||
|David Iftody
|-
| style="background-color:whitesmoke" |Selkirk—Interlake
|
|Kathy Arnason9,61223.59%
||
|Howard Hilstrom17,85643.82%
|
|Paul Pododworny8,11319.91%
|
|Tom Goodman4,99212.25%
|
|Anthony Barendregt (NA)1780.44%
||
|Howard Hilstrom
|}

Winnipeg

|-
| style="background-color:whitesmoke" |Charleswood—St. James—Assiniboia
||
|John Harvard13,90136.21%
|
|Cyril McFate11,56930.14%
|
|Dennis Kshyk2,7867.26%
|
|Curtis Moore9,99126.03%
|
|Greg Crowe1380.36%
|
|
||
|John Harvard
|-
| style="background-color:whitesmoke" |Saint Boniface
||
|Ronald J. Duhamel20,17352.17%
|
|Joyce M. Chilton8,96223.18%
|
|John Parry5,02613.00%
|
|Mike Reilly4,50511.65%
|
|
|
|
||
|Ron Duhamel
|-
| style="background-color:whitesmoke" |Winnipeg Centre
|
|Kevin Lamoureux9,31034.11%
|
|Reg Smith3,97514.56%
||
|Pat Martin11,26341.26%
|
|Michel Allard1,9157.02%
|
|Harold Dyck1340.49%
|
|Mikel Magnusson (Green)6982.56%
||
|Pat Martin
|-
| style="background-color:whitesmoke" |Winnipeg North Centre
|
|Mary Richard6,75527.47%
|
|
||
|Judy Wasylycia-Leis14,35658.39%
|
|Myron Troniak2,95012.00%
|
|Darrell Rankin5252.14%
|
|
||
|Judy Wasylycia-Leis
|-
|rowspan=3 style="background-color:whitesmoke" |Winnipeg North—St. Paul
|rowspan=3 |
|rowspan=3 |Rey D. Pagtakhan14,55638.78%
|rowspan=3 |
|rowspan=3 |Trevor Sprague11,41230.40%
|rowspan=3 |
|rowspan=3 |Roman Yereniuk7,93121.13%
|rowspan=3 |
|rowspan=3 |Dave Vust2,9597.88%
|rowspan=3 |
|rowspan=3 |Paul Sidon1100.29%
|
|Cynthia Cooke (CAP)208 0.55%
|rowspan=3 |
|rowspan=3 |Rey Pagtakhan
|-
|
|Georgina Rhéaume (Green)232 0.62%
|-
|
|Eric Truijen (NA)126 0.34%
|-
| style="background-color:whitesmoke" |Winnipeg South
||
|Reg Alcock21,43350.94%
|
|Bill Hancock12,63830.04%
|
|Duane Nicol4,22410.04%
|
|Geoffrey Lambert3,5998.55%
|
|
|
|Didz Zuzens (Ind.)1830.43%
||
|Reg Alcock
|-
|rowspan=2 style="background-color:whitesmoke" |Winnipeg South Centre
|rowspan=2 |
|rowspan=2 |Anita Neville15,23140.46%
|rowspan=2 |
|rowspan=2 |Betty Granger3,2108.53%
|rowspan=2 |
|rowspan=2 |James Allum7,50119.93%
|rowspan=2 |
|rowspan=2 |David Newman10,67528.36%
|rowspan=2 |
|rowspan=2 |David Allison1810.48%
|
|Chris Buors (Mar.)640 1.70%
|rowspan=2 |
|rowspan=2 |Lloyd Axworthy†
|-
|
|Magnus Thompson (CAP)202 0.54%
|-
|rowspan=3 style="background-color:whitesmoke" |Winnipeg—Transcona
|rowspan=3 |
|rowspan=3 |Bret Dobbin6,04118.43%
|rowspan=3 |
|rowspan=3 |Shawn Rattai8,33625.44%
|rowspan=3 |
|rowspan=3 |Bill Blaikie15,68047.85%
|rowspan=3 |
|rowspan=3 |Chris Brewer2,1336.51%
|rowspan=3 |
|rowspan=3 |James Hogaboam870.27%
|
|Theresa Ducharme (Ind.)118 0.36%
|rowspan=3 |
|rowspan=3 |Bill Blaikie
|-
|
|C. David Nickarz (Green)229 0.70%
|-
|
|Robert Scott (NA)146 0.45%
|}

Saskatchewan

Southern Saskatchewan

|-
| style="background-color:whitesmoke" |Cypress Hills—Grasslands
|
|Marlin Bryce Belt3,79112.57%
||
|David Anderson18,59361.65%
|
|Keith Murch5,10116.91%
|
|William Caton2,6768.87%
|
|
||
|Lee Morrison†
|-
| style="background-color:whitesmoke" |Palliser
|
|Garry Johnson6,49220.41%
|
|Don Findlay11,92737.50%
||
|Dick Proctor12,13638.16%
|
|Brent Shirkey1,2483.92%
|
|
||
|Dick Proctor
|-
| style="background-color:whitesmoke" |Regina—Lumsden—Lake Centre
|
|Hem Juttla4,29614.66%
||
|Larry Spencer12,58542.94%
|
|John Solomon12,42442.40%
|
|
|
|
||
|John Solomon
|-
| style="background-color:whitesmoke" |Regina—Qu'Appelle
|
|Melvin Isnana5,10617.98%
|
|Don Leier11,56740.72%
||
|Lorne Nystrom11,73141.30%
|
|
|
|
||
|Lorne Nystrom
|-
| style="background-color:whitesmoke" |Souris—Moose Mountain
|
|Myles Fuchs4,37114.35%
||
|Roy H. Bailey19,27863.28%
|
|Tom Cameron4,75515.61%
|
|Larry Gabruch2,0606.76%
|
|
||
|Roy Bailey
|-
| style="background-color:whitesmoke" |Wascana
||
|Ralph Goodale14,24441.19%|
|James Rybchuk12,49236.12%
|
|Garth Ormiston7,44621.53%|
|
|
|Wayne Gilmer4011.16%
||
|Ralph Goodale
|-
| style="background-color:whitesmoke" |Yorkton—Melville
|
|Ken Pilon5,15316.24%
||
|Garry Breitkreuz19,97862.98%
|
||Peter Champagne5,00715.78%
|
||Brent Haas1,5834.99%
|
|
||
|Garry Breitkreuz
|}

Northern Saskatchewan

|-
| style="background-color:whitesmoke" |Battlefords—Lloydminster
|
|Peter Frey5,09817.36%
||
|Gerry Ritz17,69160.23%
|
|Elgin Wayne Wyatt5,10717.39%
|
|Harry Zamonsky1,4745.02%
|
|
|
|
||
|Gerry Ritz
|-
| style="background-color:whitesmoke" |Blackstrap
|
||J. Wayne Zimmer8,20622.65%
||
|Lynne Yelich16,02844.24%
|
|Noreen Johns9,55126.36%
|
|Tim Stephenson1,9265.32%
|
|Neil Sinclair5191.43%
|
|
||
|Allan Kerpan†
|-
| style="background-color:whitesmoke" |Churchill River
||
|Rick Laliberte9,85641.81%
|
|Kerry Peterson7,67932.57%
|
|Ray Funk5,14121.81%
|
|David J. Rogers7553.20%
|
|
|
|Brendan Cross1430.61%
||
|Rick Laliberte
|-
| style="background-color:whitesmoke" |Prince Albert
|
|Tim Longworth6,75420.77%
||
|Brian Fitzpatrick14,82545.59%
|
|Dennis J. Nowoselsky6,67620.53%
|
|David Orchard3,94312.13%
|
|Benjamin Webster3170.97%
|
|
||
|Derrek Konrad§
|-
| style="background-color:whitesmoke" |Saskatoon—Humboldt
|
|Morris Bodnar7,74021.72%
||
|Jim Pankiw15,78044.28%
|
|Armand Roy9,42026.43%
|
|Lori K. Isinger1,9635.51%
|
|Jason Hanson4881.37%
|
|Michelle Luciuk2450.69%
||
|Jim Pankiw
|-
| style="background-color:whitesmoke" |Saskatoon—Rosetown—Biggar
|
|Alice Farness3,02311.27%
||
|Carol Skelton11,17741.66%
|
|Dennis Gruending11,10941.41%
|
|Dale W. Buxton1,5185.66%
|
|
|
|
||
|Dennis Gruending
|-
| style="background-color:whitesmoke" |Saskatoon—Wanuskewin
|
|Bill Patrick5,56716.82%
||
|Maurice Vellacott17,40452.57%
|
|Hugh Walker8,02224.23%
|
|Kirk Eggum1,7095.16%
|
|David Greenfield4021.21%
|
|
||
|Maurice Vellacott
|}

Alberta

Rural Alberta

|-
|rowspan=2 style="background-color:whitesmoke" |Athabasca
|rowspan=2 |
|rowspan=2 |Harold Cardinal9,79328.40%
|rowspan=2 |
|rowspan=2 |Dave Chatters18,77554.46%
|rowspan=2 |
|rowspan=2 |Alysia  Erickson8722.53%
|rowspan=2 |
|rowspan=2 |Doug Faulkner4,22412.25%
|
|Reginald  Normore (Mar.)469 1.36%
|rowspan=2 |
|rowspan=2 |David  Chatters
|-
|
|Harvey Alex Scott (Green)345 1.00%
|-
|rowspan=2 style="background-color:whitesmoke" |Crowfoot
|rowspan=2 |
|rowspan=2 |Orest Werezak2,9646.19%
|rowspan=2 |
|rowspan=2 |Kevin Sorenson33,76770.56%
|rowspan=2 |
|rowspan=2 |Jay Russell1,4573.04%
|rowspan=2 |
|rowspan=2 |Verlyn Olson6,77814.16%
|
|Jack Ramsay  (NA)2,668 5.57%
|rowspan=2 |
|rowspan=2 |Jack Ramsay
|-
|
|Valerie Morrow (NA)223 0.47%
|-
| style="background-color:whitesmoke" |Elk Island
|
|Paul Bokowski9,28917.69%
||
|Ken Epp33,73064.23%
|
|Chris Harwood3,3166.31%
|
|Rod Scarlett6,17811.76%
|
|
||
|Ken Epp
|-
| style="background-color:whitesmoke" |Lakeland
|
|Wayne Kowalski9,05020.18%
||
|Leon Benoit29,34865.45%
|
|Raymond Stone2,0694.61%
|
|Paul Pelletier4,3739.75%
|
|
||
|Leon Benoit
|-
|rowspan=2 style="background-color:whitesmoke" |Lethbridge
|rowspan=2 |
|rowspan=2 |Vaughan Hartigan7,79716.94%
|rowspan=2 |
|rowspan=2 |Rick Casson30,38066.02%
|rowspan=2 |
|rowspan=2 |Garth Hardy2,6485.75%
|rowspan=2 |
|rowspan=2 |Kimberly Denise Budd4,0628.83%
|
|Don C. Ferguson (Green)864 1.88%
|rowspan=2 |
|rowspan=2 |Rick Casson
|-
|
|Dan Lamden (CAP)264 0.57%
|-
| style="background-color:whitesmoke" |Macleod
|
|Marlene LaMontagne4,1379.41%
||
|Grant Hill30,78370.05%
|
|Dwayne Good Striker2,9456.70%
|
|Cyril R. Abbott6,07913.83%
|
|
||
|Grant Hill
|-
| style="background-color:whitesmoke" |Medicine Hat
|
|Trevor Butts4,39210.48%
||
|Monte Solberg31,13474.28%
|
|Luke Lacasse2,1535.14%
|
|Gordon Musgrove4,23610.11%
|
|
||
|Monte Solberg
|-
| style="background-color:whitesmoke" |Peace River
|
|Kim Ksenia Fenton6,49515.49%
||
|Charlie Penson27,50865.59%
|
|Patricia Lawrence2,9146.95%
|
|Milton Hommy5,02111.97%
|
|
||
|Charlie Penson
|-
| style="background-color:whitesmoke" |Red Deer
|
|Walter Kubanek6,52212.82%
||
|Bob Mills36,94072.61%
|
|Linda Roth2,3464.61%
|
|Doug Wagstaff5,0649.95%
|
|
||
|Bob Mills
|-
| style="background-color:whitesmoke" |Wetaskiwin
|
|John Jackie8,31817.17%
||
|Dale Johnston33,67569.50%
|
|Cliff Reid2,0454.22%
|
|Kenneth R. Sockett4,4139.11%
|
|
||
|Dale Johnston
|-
| style="background-color:whitesmoke" |Wild Rose
|
|Bryan E. Mahoney6,33411.09%
||
|Myron Thompson40,19370.36%
|
|Anne Wilson2,3204.06%
|
|Truper McBride7,37012.90%
|
|Garnet T. Hammer (Ind.)9081.59%
||
|Myron Thompson
|-
| style="background-color:whitesmoke" |Yellowhead
|
|John Higgerty6,34815.64%
||
|Rob Merrifield26,82466.08%
|
|J. Noel Lapierre1,9104.71%
|
|Dale F. Galbraith5,14112.66%
|
|Jacob Strydhorst (NA)3710.91%
||
|Cliff Breitkreuz†
|}

Edmonton and environs

|-
| style="background-color:whitesmoke" |Edmonton Centre-East
|
|Sue Olsen14,32334.21%
||
|Peter Goldring17,76842.44%
|
|Ray Martin7,30417.44%
|
|Kevin Mahfouz2,2525.38%
|
|Naomi Rankin (Comm.)2220.53%
||
|Peter Goldring
|-
| style="background-color:whitesmoke" |Edmonton North
|
|Jim Jacuta14,78634.33%
||
|Deborah Grey22,06351.22%
|
|Laurie Lang3,2167.47%
|
|Dean Sanduga3,0106.99%
|
|
||
|Deborah Grey
|-
|rowspan=3 style="background-color:whitesmoke" |Edmonton Southeast
|rowspan=3 |
|rowspan=3 |David Kilgour21,10950.87%
|rowspan=3 |
|rowspan=3 |Tim Uppal16,39239.51%
|rowspan=3 |
|rowspan=3 |Joginder Kandola1,2853.10%
|rowspan=3 |
|rowspan=3 |Allan Ryan2,2695.47%
|
|Matthew James (Comm.)97 0.23%
|rowspan=3 |
|rowspan=3 |David Kilgour
|-
|
|Michael Sekuloff (CAP)154 0.37%
|-
|
|Richard Shelford (NLP)187 0.45%
|-
|rowspan=2 style="background-color:whitesmoke" |Edmonton Southwest
|rowspan=2 |
|rowspan=2 |Chiu Lau18,22333.98%
|rowspan=2 |
|rowspan=2 |James Rajotte26,19748.85%
|rowspan=2 |
|rowspan=2 |Bernie Keeler2,7465.12%
|rowspan=2 |
|rowspan=2 |Joseph Fernando5,80310.82%
|
|Wade McKinley (NLP)195 0.36%
|rowspan=2 |
|rowspan=2 |Ian McClelland†
|-
|
|Jerry Paschen (Green)462 0.86%
|-
|rowspan=3 style="background-color:whitesmoke" |Edmonton—Strathcona
|rowspan=3 |
|rowspan=3 |Jonathan Dai17,81631.89%
|rowspan=3 |
|rowspan=3 |Rahim Jaffer23,46342.00%
|rowspan=3 |
|rowspan=3 |Hélène Narayana8,25614.78%
|rowspan=3 |
|rowspan=3 |Gregory Toogood5,0479.04%
|
|Kevan Hunter (M-L)164 0.29%
|rowspan=3 |
|rowspan=3 |Rahim Jaffer
|-
|
|Ken Kirk (Mar.)814 1.46%
|-
|
|Kesa Rose Semenchuk (CAP)299 0.54%
|-
|rowspan=2 style="background-color:whitesmoke" |Edmonton West
|rowspan=2 |
|rowspan=2 |Anne McLellan21,97844.24%
|rowspan=2 |
|rowspan=2 |Betty Unger21,24542.77%
|rowspan=2 |
|rowspan=2 |Richard D. Vanderberg2,8955.83%
|rowspan=2 |
|rowspan=2 |Rory J. Koopmans3,0096.06%
|
|Peggy Morton (M-L)194 0.39%
|rowspan=2 |
|rowspan=2 |Anne McLellan
|-
|
|Dan Parker (CAP)354 0.71%
|-
| style="background-color:whitesmoke" |St. Albert
|
|Bob Russell13,63724.78%
||
|John Williams32,74559.50%
|
|John Williams2,9655.39%
|
|Andy Jones5,68710.33%
|
|
||
|John Williams
|}

Calgary

|-
|rowspan=2 style="background-color:whitesmoke" |Calgary Centre
|rowspan=2 |
|rowspan=2 |Joanne Levy5,6309.84%
|rowspan=2 |
|rowspan=2 |Eric Lowther22,05438.53%
|rowspan=2 |
|rowspan=2 |Don LePan1,6042.80%
|rowspan=2 |
|rowspan=2 |Joe Clark26,35846.05%
|rowspan=2 |
|rowspan=2 |Michael Alvarez-Toye1,1702.04%
|
|Margaret Peggy Askin (M-L)133 0.23%
|rowspan=2 |
|rowspan=2 |Eric Lowther
|-
|
|Beverley Smith (Ind.)293 0.51%
|-
|rowspan=3 style="background-color:whitesmoke" |Calgary East
|rowspan=3 |
|rowspan=3 |Doug Perras6,84320.47%
|rowspan=3 |
|rowspan=3 |Deepak Obhrai18,14154.26%
|rowspan=3 |
|rowspan=3 |Kaie Jones1,4444.32%
|rowspan=3 |
|rowspan=3 |Roger Richard5,51016.48%
|rowspan=3 |
|rowspan=3 |
|
|Jason Devine (Comm.)152 0.45%
|rowspan=3 |
|rowspan=3 |Deepak Obhrai
|-
|
|Grant Adam Krieger (Mar.)1,222 3.65%
|-
|
|Neeraj Varma (NLP)124 0.37%
|-
| style="background-color:whitesmoke" |Calgary Northeast
|
|Sam Keshavjee9,84121.79%
||
|Art Hanger28,24262.54%
|
|H. Ken Sahil1,8524.10%
|
|Jerry Vague5,22211.56%
|
|
|
|
||
|Art Hanger
|-
| style="background-color:whitesmoke" |Calgary—Nose Hill
|
|Brian Thiessen11,60219.43%
||
|Diane Ablonczy35,90460.13%
|
|Jon Adams2,2273.73%
|
|James F. McArdle8,69614.56%
|
|Andrew Pickles1,0921.83%
|
|Maureen Ann Roberts (CAP)1940.32%
||
|Diane Ablonczy
|-
| style="background-color:whitesmoke" |Calgary Southeast
|
|Dana Peace6,64612.19%
||
|Jason Kenney34,49263.25%
|
|Giorgio Cattabeni1,1112.04%
|
|Ray Clark11,35320.82%
|
|James Stephen Kohut9311.71%
|
|
||
|Jason Kenney
|-
| style="background-color:whitesmoke" |Calgary Southwest
|
|Barry J. Rust7,95414.93%
||
|Preston Manning34,52964.81%
|
|Jennifer Stewart2,1133.97%
|
|Paul Monaghan8,67916.29%
|
|
|
|
||
|Preston Manning
|-
| style="background-color:whitesmoke" |Calgary West
|
|Frank Bruseker11,18118.19%
||
|Rob Anders33,22254.05%
|
|Greg Klassen2,3503.82%
|
|Jim Silye13,25921.57%
|
|Evan Osenton1,4562.37%
|
|
||
|Rob Anders
|}

British Columbia

BC Interior

|-
|rowspan=2 style="background-color:whitesmoke" |Cariboo—Chilcotin
|rowspan=2 |
|rowspan=2 |John McCarvill6,55520.34%
|rowspan=2 |
|rowspan=2 |Philip Mayfield19,21359.63%
|rowspan=2 |
|rowspan=2 |Raymond John Skelly2,9159.05%
|rowspan=2 |
|rowspan=2 |Pamela J. Culbert2,8228.76%
|rowspan=2 |
|rowspan=2 |
|
|Al Charlebois (M-L)124 0.38%
|rowspan=2 |
|rowspan=2 |Philip Mayfield
|-
|
|William Turkel (Ind.)591 1.83%
|-
| style="background-color:whitesmoke" |Kamloops, Thompson and Highland Valleys
|
|Jon Moser7,58215.63%
||
|Betty Hinton23,57748.59%
|
|Nelson Riis13,60028.03%
|
|Randy Patch3,2176.63%
|
|
|
|Ernie Schmidt (CAP)5441.12%
||
|Nelson Riis
|-
| style="background-color:whitesmoke" |Kelowna
|
|Joe Leask13,56423.86%
||
|Werner Schmidt33,81059.47%
|
|John O. Powell3,5726.28%
|
|Doug Mallo4,7088.28%
|
|
|
|Jack W. Peach (CAP)1,1992.11%
||
|Werner Schmidt
|-
|rowspan=3 style="background-color:whitesmoke" |Kootenay—Boundary—Okanagan
|rowspan=3 |
|rowspan=3 |Bill Barlee11,35727.36%
|rowspan=3 |
|rowspan=3 |Jim Gouk19,38646.70%
|rowspan=3 |
|rowspan=3 |Don Scarlett4,0919.85%
|rowspan=3 |
|rowspan=3 |Michele Elise Duncan2,1475.17%
|rowspan=3 |
|rowspan=3 |Andrew Shadrack2,6896.48%
|
|Bev Collins (CAP)762 1.84%
|rowspan=3 |
|rowspan=3 |Jim Gouk
|-
|
|Annie Holtby (NLP)191 0.46%
|-
|
|Dan Loehndorf (Mar.)889 2.14%
|-
| style="background-color:whitesmoke" |Kootenay—Columbia
|
|Delvin R. Chatterson5,58114.74%
||
|Jim Abbott25,66367.78%
|
|Andrea Dunlop3,2978.71%
|
|Jerry Pirie2,1655.72%
|
|Jubilee Rose Cacaci1,1583.06%
|
|
||
|Jim Abbott
|-
|rowspan=5 style="background-color:whitesmoke" |Okanagan—Coquihalla
|rowspan=5 |
|rowspan=5 |Tom Chapman9,92320.46%
|rowspan=5 |
|rowspan=5 |Stockwell Day28,79459.37%
|rowspan=5 |
|rowspan=5 |Ken Ellis4,0968.45%
|rowspan=5 |
|rowspan=5 |Gordon John Seiter2,9396.06%
|rowspan=5 |
|rowspan=5 |Harry Naegel1,1102.29%
|
|Clay Harmon (NA)95 0.20%
|rowspan=5 |
|rowspan=5 |Stockwell Day
|-
|
|Elizabeth Innes (NLP)167 0.34%
|-
|
|Dorothy-Jean O'Donnell (M-L)99 0.20%
|-
|
|Larry Taylor (CAP)461 0.95%
|-
|
|Teresa Taylor (Mar.)818 1.69%
|-
|rowspan=3 style="background-color:whitesmoke" |Okanagan—Shuswap
|rowspan=3 |
|rowspan=3 |Marvin Friesen9,85520.59%
|rowspan=3 |
|rowspan=3 |Darrel Stinson29,34561.30%
|rowspan=3 |
|rowspan=3 |Wayne Alexander Fowler4,0608.48%
|rowspan=3 |
|rowspan=3 |Sheila Marguerite Wardman3,0966.47%
|rowspan=3 |
|rowspan=3 |
|
|K. No Daniels (NA)447 0.93%
|rowspan=3 |
|rowspan=3 |Darrel Stinson
|-
|
|Vera Gottlieb (CAP)724 1.51%
|-
|
|David Lethbridge (Comm.)347 0.72%
|-
|rowspan=3 style="background-color:whitesmoke" |Prince George—Bulkley Valley
|rowspan=3 |
|rowspan=3 |Jeannette Townsend8,20223.43%
|rowspan=3 |
|rowspan=3 |Dick Harris20,59658.84%
|rowspan=3 |
|rowspan=3 |Mark Walsh2,0295.80%
|rowspan=3 |
|rowspan=3 |Oliver William Ray2,4486.99%
|rowspan=3 |
|rowspan=3 |John Grogan7932.27%
|
|David MacKay (M-L)84 0.24%
|rowspan=3 |
|rowspan=3 |Dick Harris
|-
|
|John Van der Woude (NA)152 0.43%
|-
|
|Suzanne Woodrow (CAP)701 2.00%
|-
|rowspan=2 style="background-color:whitesmoke" |Prince George—Peace River
|rowspan=2 |
|rowspan=2 |Arleene Thorpe5,31915.53%
|rowspan=2 |
|rowspan=2 |Jay Hill23,84069.62%
|rowspan=2 |
|rowspan=2 |Lenart Nelson1,5974.66%
|rowspan=2 |
|rowspan=2 |Jan Christiansen2,1036.14%
|rowspan=2 |
|rowspan=2 |Hilary Crowley7442.17%
|
|Henry A. Dunbar (CAP)562 1.64%
|rowspan=2 |
|rowspan=2 |Jay Hill
|-
|
|Colby Nicholson (M-L)80 0.23%
|-
|rowspan=2 style="background-color:whitesmoke" |Skeena
|rowspan=2 |
|rowspan=2 |Rhoda Witherly8,71429.12%
|rowspan=2 |
|rowspan=2 |Andy Burton12,78742.73%
|rowspan=2 |
|rowspan=2 |Larry Guno6,27320.96%
|rowspan=2 |
|rowspan=2 |Devin Lee Glowinski9653.22%
|rowspan=2 |
|rowspan=2 |Roger Colin Benham6882.30%
|
|Cliff Brown (NLP)140 0.47%
|rowspan=2 |
|rowspan=2 |Mike Scott†
|-
|
|George Joseph (NA)361 1.21%
|}

Fraser Valley and Southern Lower Mainland

|-
|rowspan=2 style="background-color:whitesmoke" |Delta—South Richmond
|rowspan=2 |
|rowspan=2 |Jim Doswell15,85829.16%
|rowspan=2 |
|rowspan=2 |John M. Cummins30,88256.79%
|rowspan=2 |
|rowspan=2 |Ernie Fulton3,0605.63%
|rowspan=2 |
|rowspan=2 |Curtis MacDonald3,8387.06%
|rowspan=2 |
|rowspan=2 |
|
|Frank Wagner (NA)225 0.41%
|rowspan=2 |
|rowspan=2 |John Cummins
|-
|
|Allan Warnke (CAP)517 0.95%
|-
| style="background-color:whitesmoke" |Dewdney—Alouette
|
|Jatinder Sidhu8,71718.07%
||
|Grant McNally28,18158.42%
|
|Malcolm James Crockett5,53511.47%
|
|Gord Kehler5,80412.03%
|
|
|
|
||
|Grant McNally
|-
|rowspan=4 style="background-color:whitesmoke" |Fraser Valley
|rowspan=4 |
|rowspan=4 |Hal H. Singleton8,96516.29%
|rowspan=4 |
|rowspan=4 |Chuck Strahl38,50969.97%
|rowspan=4 |
|rowspan=4 |Rob Lees3,1855.79%
|rowspan=4 |
|rowspan=4 |Rocky Nenka2,3304.23%
|rowspan=4 |
|rowspan=4 |Carol Battaglio5280.96%
|
|Debbie Anderson (CAP)425 0.77%
|rowspan=4 |
|rowspan=4 |Chuck Strahl
|-
|
|Chris Bolster (Comm.)69 0.13%
|-
|
|Norm Siefken (Mar.)811 1.47%
|-
|
|Ed Van Woudenberg (NA)212 0.39%
|-
| style="background-color:whitesmoke" |Langley—Abbotsford
|
|Steve Ferguson9,55417.26%
||
|Randy White38,81070.11%
|
|Paul Latham2,3534.25%
|
|Bev Braaten4,2187.62%
|
|
|
|Harold John Ludwig (NA)4200.76%
||
|Randy White
|-
|rowspan=2 style="background-color:whitesmoke" |Richmond
|rowspan=2 |
|rowspan=2 |Raymond Chan19,94042.04%
|rowspan=2 |
|rowspan=2 |Joe Peschisolido21,06444.41%
|rowspan=2 |
|rowspan=2 |Gail Paquette2,6955.68%
|rowspan=2 |
|rowspan=2 |Frank Peter Tofin2,5785.44%
|rowspan=2 |
|rowspan=2 |Kevan Hudson8971.89%
|
|Kathy McClement (NLP)164 0.35%
|rowspan=2 |
|rowspan=2 |Raymond Chan
|-
|
|Edith Petersen (M-L)93 0.20%
|-
|rowspan=2 style="background-color:whitesmoke" |South Surrey—White Rock—Langley
|rowspan=2 |
|rowspan=2 |Bill Brooks10,20021.26%
|rowspan=2 |
|rowspan=2 |Val Meredith28,76259.95%
|rowspan=2 |
|rowspan=2 |Matt Todd2,7185.66%
|rowspan=2 |
|rowspan=2 |Alistair Johnston4,79610.00%
|rowspan=2 |
|rowspan=2 |Steve Chitty8441.76%
|
|Mavis Louise Becker (Mar.)559 1.17%
|rowspan=2 |
|rowspan=2 |Val Meredith
|-
|
|Daphne Quance (NLP)100 0.21%
|-
| style="background-color:whitesmoke" |Surrey Central
|
|Peter Warkentin19,51333.78%
||
|Gurmant Grewal29,81251.61%
|
|Dan Goy3,2115.56%
|
|Dan Baxter3,9406.82%
|
|David Walters1,1752.03%
|
|Harjit Daudharia (Comm.)1140.20%
||
|Gurmant Grewal
|-
|rowspan=2 style="background-color:whitesmoke" |Surrey North
|rowspan=2 |
|rowspan=2 |Shinder Purewal10,27928.87%
|rowspan=2 |
|rowspan=2 |Chuck Cadman19,97356.10%
|rowspan=2 |
|rowspan=2 |Art Hildebrant2,6197.36%
|rowspan=2 |
|rowspan=2 |Dareck Faichuk1,7144.81%
|rowspan=2 |
|rowspan=2 |Brian Lutes5561.56%
|
|Tyler Campbell (Comm.)174 0.49%
|rowspan=2 |
|rowspan=2 |Chuck Cadman
|-
|
|Gerhard Herwig (NA)285 0.80%
|}

Vancouver and Northern Lower Mainland

|-
| style="background-color:whitesmoke" |Burnaby—Douglas
|
|Francesca Zumpano10,77423.67%
|
|Alan McDonnell15,05733.08%
||
|Svend Robinson17,01837.39%
|
|Kenneth Edgar King2,4775.44%
|
|
|
|
|
|Roger Perkins (Comm.)1890.42%
||
|Svend Robinson
|-
|rowspan=2 style="background-color:whitesmoke" |New Westminster—Coquitlam—Burnaby
|rowspan=2 |
|rowspan=2 |Lee Rankin14,57930.97%
|rowspan=2 |
|rowspan=2 |Paul Forseth20,69843.97%
|rowspan=2 |
|rowspan=2 |Lorrie Williams7,07615.03%
|rowspan=2 |
|rowspan=2 |Mike Redmond3,4927.42%
|rowspan=2 |
|rowspan=2 |François C. Nantel1,0282.18%
|rowspan=2 |
|rowspan=2 |
|
|Hanne Gidora (Comm.)109 0.23%
|rowspan=2 |
|rowspan=2 |Paul Forseth
|-
|
|Brian Sproule (M-L)93 0.20%
|-
|rowspan=4 style="background-color:whitesmoke" |North Vancouver
|rowspan=4 |
|rowspan=4 |Bill Bell18,34332.77%
|rowspan=4 |
|rowspan=4 |Ted White27,92049.88%
|rowspan=4 |
|rowspan=4 |Sam Schechter2,7604.93%
|rowspan=4 |
|rowspan=4 |Laurence Putnam3,9757.10%
|rowspan=4 |
|rowspan=4 |
|rowspan=4 |
|rowspan=4 |Diana Jewell8771.57%
|
|Tunya Audain (Mar.)1,008 1.80%
|rowspan=4 |
|rowspan=4 |Ted White
|-
|
|Dallas Collis (Ind.)760 1.36%
|-
|
|Rusty Corben (Ind.)253 0.45%
|-
|
|Michael Hill (M-L)80 0.14%
|-
|rowspan=2 style="background-color:whitesmoke" |Port Moody—Coquitlam—Port Coquitlam
|rowspan=2 |
|rowspan=2 |Lou Sekora16,93729.39%
|rowspan=2 |
|rowspan=2 |James Moore28,63149.69%
|rowspan=2 |
|rowspan=2 |Jamie Arden5,3409.27%
|rowspan=2 |
|rowspan=2 |Joe Gluska4,5067.82%
|rowspan=2 |
|rowspan=2 |Dave King8391.46%
|rowspan=2 |
|rowspan=2 |Will Arlow4520.78%
|
|Paul Geddes (Mar.)818 1.42%
|rowspan=2 |
|rowspan=2 |Sharon Hayes†
|-
|
|George Gidora (Comm.)98 0.17%
|-
|rowspan=4 style="background-color:whitesmoke" |Vancouver Centre
|rowspan=4 |
|rowspan=4 |Hedy Fry24,55342.30%
|rowspan=4 |
|rowspan=4 |John Mortimer15,17626.15%
|rowspan=4 |
|rowspan=4 |Scott Robertson6,99312.05%
|rowspan=4 |
|rowspan=4 |Lee Johnson6,82811.76%
|rowspan=4 |
|rowspan=4 |Jamie-Lee Hamilton2,2853.94%
|rowspan=4 |
|rowspan=4 |Jeff Jewell7421.28%
|
|Kimball Cariou (Comm.)99 0.17%
|rowspan=4 |
|rowspan=4 |Hedy Madeleine Fry
|-
|
|Marc Emery (Mar.)1,116 1.92%
|-
|
|Valerie Laporte (NLP)177 0.30%
|-
|
|Joseph Theriault (M-L)75 0.13%
|-
|rowspan=4 style="background-color:whitesmoke" |Vancouver East
|rowspan=4 |
|rowspan=4 |Mason Loh13,42133.74%
|rowspan=4 |
|rowspan=4 |Sal Vetro5,53613.92%
|rowspan=4 |
|rowspan=4 |Libby Davies16,81842.28%
|rowspan=4 |
|rowspan=4 |Michael Walsh1,4393.62%
|rowspan=4 |
|rowspan=4 |Kelly Elizabeth White9752.45%
|rowspan=4 |
|rowspan=4 |Brian Bacon4321.09%
|
|Edna Mathilda Brass (NA)196 0.49%
|rowspan=4 |
|rowspan=4 |Libby Davies
|-
|
|Rosemary Galte (NLP)97 0.24%
|-
|
|Gloria Anne Kieler (NA)143 0.36%
|-
|
|David Malmo-Levine (Mar.)724 1.82%
|-
|rowspan=2 style="background-color:whitesmoke" |Vancouver Kingsway
|rowspan=2 |
|rowspan=2 |Sophia Leung16,11843.07%
|rowspan=2 |
|rowspan=2 |Alice Wong11,07629.60%
|rowspan=2 |
|rowspan=2 |Victor Wong5,92115.82%
|rowspan=2 |
|rowspan=2 |Kanman Wong1,8034.82%
|rowspan=2 |
|rowspan=2 |Phillip Petrik1,0092.70%
|rowspan=2 |
|rowspan=2 |Connie Fogal1,2003.21%
|
|Elwyn Patterson (Comm.)168 0.45%
|rowspan=2 |
|rowspan=2 |Sophia Leung
|-
|
|Donna Petersen (M-L)126 0.34%
|-
|rowspan=2 style="background-color:whitesmoke" |Vancouver Quadra
|rowspan=2 |
|rowspan=2 |Stephen Owen22,25344.84%
|rowspan=2 |
|rowspan=2 |Kerry-Lynne Findlay18,61337.50%
|rowspan=2 |
|rowspan=2 |Loretta Woodcock2,5955.23%
|rowspan=2 |
|rowspan=2 |Bill Clarke4,1128.28%
|rowspan=2 |
|rowspan=2 |Doug Warkentin1,4342.89%
|rowspan=2 |
|rowspan=2 |Chris Shaw3900.79%
|
|Steven Beck (NLP)126 0.25%
|rowspan=2 |
|rowspan=2 |Ted McWhinney†
|-
|
|Anne Jamieson (M-L)109 0.22%
|-
|rowspan=4 style="background-color:whitesmoke" |Vancouver South—Burnaby
|rowspan=4 |
|rowspan=4 |Herb Dhaliwal17,70542.69%
|rowspan=4 |
|rowspan=4 |Ron Jack15,38437.09%
|rowspan=4 |
|rowspan=4 |Herschel Hardin3,8489.27%
|rowspan=4 |
|rowspan=4 |Dan Tidball2,6496.38%
|rowspan=4 |
|rowspan=4 |Imtiaz Popat6461.55%
|rowspan=4 |
|rowspan=4 |Adam Sealey4301.03%
|
|Charles Boylan (M-L)1010.24%
|rowspan=4 |
|rowspan=4 |Herb Dhaliwal
|-
|
|Michelle Jasmine Chang (Ind.)4651.12%
|-
|
|Derrick O'Keefe (Ind.)1581.03%
|-
|
|Prince Pabbies (NLP)810.19%
|-
| style="background-color:whitesmoke" |West Vancouver—Sunshine Coast
|
|Ian McKay14,16926.60%
||
|John Reynolds25,54647.97%
|
|Telis Savvaidis3,3516.29%
|
|Kate Manvell4,9939.38%
|
|Jane Bishop2,6054.89%
|
|Marc Bombois9761.83%
|
|Dana Larsen (Mar.)1,6183.04%
||
|John Reynolds
|}

Vancouver Island

|-
| style="background-color:whitesmoke" |Esquimalt—Juan de Fuca
|
|Alan Thompson11,53623.92%
||
|Keith Martin23,98249.73%
|
|Carol E. Harris6,46813.41%
|
|John Vukovic3,8578.00%
|
|Casey Brennan2,0564.26%
|
|Paul E. Tessier3240.67%
|
|
||
|Keith Martin
|-
|rowspan=2 style="background-color:whitesmoke" |Nanaimo—Alberni
|rowspan=2 |
|rowspan=2 |Hira Chopra10,87720.70%
|rowspan=2 |
|rowspan=2 |James D. Lunney26,51650.45%
|rowspan=2 |
|rowspan=2 |Bill Holdom7,63514.53%
|rowspan=2 |
|rowspan=2 |Bill McCullough5,34010.16%
|rowspan=2 |
|rowspan=2 |
|rowspan=2 |
|rowspan=2 |Marty Howe2350.45%
|
|Brunie Brunie (Ind.)830 1.58%
|rowspan=2 |
|rowspan=2 |Bill Gilmour†
|-
|
|Donald Lavallee (Mar.)1,125 2.14%
|-
|rowspan=2 style="background-color:whitesmoke" |Nanaimo—Cowichan
|rowspan=2 |
|rowspan=2 |Marshall Cooper10,85721.42%
|rowspan=2 |
|rowspan=2 |Reed Elley23,64146.63%
|rowspan=2 |
|rowspan=2 |Garth Mirau8,59916.96%
|rowspan=2 |
|rowspan=2 |Cynthia-Mary Hemsworth3,6407.18%
|rowspan=2 |
|rowspan=2 |Norm Abbey1,1962.36%
|rowspan=2 |
|rowspan=2 |
|
|Doug Catley (CAP)1,500 2.96%
|rowspan=2 |
|rowspan=2 |Reed Elley
|-
|
|Meaghan Walker-Williams (Mar.)1,262 2.49%
|-
|rowspan=2 style="background-color:whitesmoke" |Saanich—Gulf Islands
|rowspan=2 |
|rowspan=2 |Karen Knott19,00232.30%
|rowspan=2 |
|rowspan=2 |Gary Lunn25,39243.16%
|rowspan=2 |
|rowspan=2 |Pat O'Neill4,7218.02%
|rowspan=2 |
|rowspan=2 |Don Page6,04910.28%
|rowspan=2 |
|rowspan=2 |Wally Du Temple3,2435.51%
|rowspan=2 |
|rowspan=2 |Kathleen Lapeyrouse2170.37%
|
|Dan Moreau (NA)123 0.21%
|rowspan=2 |
|rowspan=2 |Gary Lunn
|-
|
|Charley Stimac (Comm.)88 0.15%
|-
|rowspan=2 style="background-color:whitesmoke" |Vancouver Island North
|rowspan=2 |
|rowspan=2 |Daniel P. Smith12,09224.84%
|rowspan=2 |
|rowspan=2 |John Duncan24,84451.04%
|rowspan=2 |
|rowspan=2 |Alex Turner5,70111.71%
|rowspan=2 |
|rowspan=2 |David R. Tingley2,9976.16%
|rowspan=2 |
|rowspan=2 |Pam Munroe2,5325.20%
|rowspan=2 |
|rowspan=2 |Nancy More2050.42%
|
|Jack East (M-L)92 0.19%
|rowspan=2 |
|rowspan=2 |John Duncan
|-
|
|John Krell (NA)216 0.44%
|-
|rowspan=4 style="background-color:whitesmoke" |Victoria
|rowspan=4 |
|rowspan=4 |David Anderson23,73042.65%
|rowspan=4 |
|rowspan=4 |Bruce Hallsor16,50229.66%
|rowspan=4 |
|rowspan=4 |David Turner7,24313.02%
|rowspan=4 |
|rowspan=4 |Brian Burchill3,6296.52%
|rowspan=4 |
|rowspan=4 |Joan Elizabeth Russow3,2645.87%
|rowspan=4 |
|rowspan=4 |Cal Danyluk1380.25%
|
|Chuck Beyer (Mar.)863 1.55%
|rowspan=4 |
|rowspan=4 |David Anderson
|-
|
|Lorenzo A. Bouchard (Ind.)101 0.18%
|-
|
|Mary Moreau (NA)75 0.13%
|-
|
|Scott Rushton (Comm.)92 0.17%
|}

Nunavut

|-
| style="background-color:whitesmoke" |Nunavut
||
|Nancy Karetak-Lindell5,32769.01%
|
|Palluq Susan Enuaraq1,41018.27%
|
|Mike Sherman6338.20%
|
|Brian Robert Jones3494.52%
||
|Nancy Karetak-Lindell
|}

Northwest Territories

|-
| style="background-color:whitesmoke" |Western Arctic
||
|Ethel Blondin-Andrew5,85545.60%
|
|Fred Turner2,27317.70%
|
|Dennis Bevington3,43026.71%
|
|Bruce McLaughlin1,2829.98%
||
|Ethel Blondin-Andrew
|}

Yukon

|-
| style="background-color:whitesmoke" |Yukon
||
|Larry Bagnell4,29332.48%
|
|Jim Kenyon3,65927.68%
|
|Louise Hardy4,22331.95%
|
|Don Cox9917.50%
|
|Geoffrey Capp530.40%
||
|Larry Bagnell
|}

Notes

References
Elections Canada - Official Results of 37th General Election

 
2000